

534001–534100 

|-bgcolor=#fefefe
| 534001 ||  || — || August 25, 2014 || Haleakala || Pan-STARRS ||  || align=right data-sort-value="0.94" | 940 m || 
|-id=002 bgcolor=#fefefe
| 534002 ||  || — || November 25, 2011 || Haleakala || Pan-STARRS ||  || align=right data-sort-value="0.76" | 760 m || 
|-id=003 bgcolor=#fefefe
| 534003 ||  || — || July 7, 2014 || Haleakala || Pan-STARRS ||  || align=right data-sort-value="0.65" | 650 m || 
|-id=004 bgcolor=#fefefe
| 534004 ||  || — || November 11, 2007 || Mount Lemmon || Mount Lemmon Survey ||  || align=right data-sort-value="0.83" | 830 m || 
|-id=005 bgcolor=#fefefe
| 534005 ||  || — || November 20, 2003 || Kitt Peak || Spacewatch ||  || align=right data-sort-value="0.75" | 750 m || 
|-id=006 bgcolor=#fefefe
| 534006 ||  || — || July 29, 2014 || Haleakala || Pan-STARRS || NYS || align=right data-sort-value="0.60" | 600 m || 
|-id=007 bgcolor=#fefefe
| 534007 ||  || — || July 7, 2014 || Haleakala || Pan-STARRS ||  || align=right data-sort-value="0.70" | 700 m || 
|-id=008 bgcolor=#fefefe
| 534008 ||  || — || August 25, 2014 || Kitt Peak || Spacewatch ||  || align=right data-sort-value="0.91" | 910 m || 
|-id=009 bgcolor=#fefefe
| 534009 ||  || — || September 18, 2003 || Kitt Peak || Spacewatch ||  || align=right data-sort-value="0.57" | 570 m || 
|-id=010 bgcolor=#fefefe
| 534010 ||  || — || August 25, 2014 || Haleakala || Pan-STARRS ||  || align=right data-sort-value="0.71" | 710 m || 
|-id=011 bgcolor=#fefefe
| 534011 ||  || — || October 20, 2003 || Kitt Peak || Spacewatch ||  || align=right data-sort-value="0.68" | 680 m || 
|-id=012 bgcolor=#E9E9E9
| 534012 ||  || — || October 10, 2010 || Mount Lemmon || Mount Lemmon Survey ||  || align=right data-sort-value="0.78" | 780 m || 
|-id=013 bgcolor=#fefefe
| 534013 ||  || — || August 25, 2014 || Haleakala || Pan-STARRS ||  || align=right data-sort-value="0.64" | 640 m || 
|-id=014 bgcolor=#fefefe
| 534014 ||  || — || August 25, 2014 || Haleakala || Pan-STARRS ||  || align=right data-sort-value="0.74" | 740 m || 
|-id=015 bgcolor=#E9E9E9
| 534015 ||  || — || August 25, 2014 || Haleakala || Pan-STARRS ||  || align=right data-sort-value="0.88" | 880 m || 
|-id=016 bgcolor=#fefefe
| 534016 ||  || — || October 10, 2007 || Catalina || CSS ||  || align=right data-sort-value="0.62" | 620 m || 
|-id=017 bgcolor=#fefefe
| 534017 ||  || — || August 25, 2014 || Haleakala || Pan-STARRS ||  || align=right data-sort-value="0.60" | 600 m || 
|-id=018 bgcolor=#fefefe
| 534018 ||  || — || September 20, 2006 || Catalina || CSS ||  || align=right data-sort-value="0.90" | 900 m || 
|-id=019 bgcolor=#fefefe
| 534019 ||  || — || October 19, 2007 || Anderson Mesa || LONEOS ||  || align=right data-sort-value="0.68" | 680 m || 
|-id=020 bgcolor=#fefefe
| 534020 ||  || — || September 11, 2004 || Kitt Peak || Spacewatch ||  || align=right data-sort-value="0.77" | 770 m || 
|-id=021 bgcolor=#fefefe
| 534021 ||  || — || September 10, 2007 || Mount Lemmon || Mount Lemmon Survey ||  || align=right data-sort-value="0.60" | 600 m || 
|-id=022 bgcolor=#fefefe
| 534022 ||  || — || September 12, 2007 || Mount Lemmon || Mount Lemmon Survey ||  || align=right data-sort-value="0.43" | 430 m || 
|-id=023 bgcolor=#fefefe
| 534023 ||  || — || August 20, 2014 || Haleakala || Pan-STARRS ||  || align=right data-sort-value="0.71" | 710 m || 
|-id=024 bgcolor=#fefefe
| 534024 ||  || — || September 13, 2007 || Mount Lemmon || Mount Lemmon Survey ||  || align=right data-sort-value="0.55" | 550 m || 
|-id=025 bgcolor=#fefefe
| 534025 ||  || — || November 26, 2003 || Kitt Peak || Spacewatch ||  || align=right data-sort-value="0.68" | 680 m || 
|-id=026 bgcolor=#fefefe
| 534026 ||  || — || December 29, 2011 || Mount Lemmon || Mount Lemmon Survey ||  || align=right data-sort-value="0.88" | 880 m || 
|-id=027 bgcolor=#fefefe
| 534027 ||  || — || February 16, 2012 || Haleakala || Pan-STARRS ||  || align=right data-sort-value="0.89" | 890 m || 
|-id=028 bgcolor=#E9E9E9
| 534028 ||  || — || October 2, 2010 || Kitt Peak || Spacewatch ||  || align=right | 1.2 km || 
|-id=029 bgcolor=#fefefe
| 534029 ||  || — || June 30, 2014 || Haleakala || Pan-STARRS ||  || align=right data-sort-value="0.75" | 750 m || 
|-id=030 bgcolor=#fefefe
| 534030 ||  || — || December 19, 2007 || Mount Lemmon || Mount Lemmon Survey ||  || align=right data-sort-value="0.64" | 640 m || 
|-id=031 bgcolor=#fefefe
| 534031 ||  || — || January 19, 2004 || Kitt Peak || Spacewatch ||  || align=right data-sort-value="0.75" | 750 m || 
|-id=032 bgcolor=#fefefe
| 534032 ||  || — || August 25, 2014 || Haleakala || Pan-STARRS || V || align=right data-sort-value="0.60" | 600 m || 
|-id=033 bgcolor=#E9E9E9
| 534033 ||  || — || October 28, 2010 || Mount Lemmon || Mount Lemmon Survey ||  || align=right data-sort-value="0.73" | 730 m || 
|-id=034 bgcolor=#E9E9E9
| 534034 ||  || — || October 9, 2010 || Mount Lemmon || Mount Lemmon Survey ||  || align=right data-sort-value="0.75" | 750 m || 
|-id=035 bgcolor=#fefefe
| 534035 ||  || — || July 31, 2014 || Haleakala || Pan-STARRS ||  || align=right data-sort-value="0.70" | 700 m || 
|-id=036 bgcolor=#fefefe
| 534036 ||  || — || February 15, 2012 || Haleakala || Pan-STARRS ||  || align=right | 1.00 km || 
|-id=037 bgcolor=#fefefe
| 534037 ||  || — || July 27, 2014 || Haleakala || Pan-STARRS ||  || align=right data-sort-value="0.68" | 680 m || 
|-id=038 bgcolor=#fefefe
| 534038 ||  || — || June 13, 2010 || Mount Lemmon || Mount Lemmon Survey ||  || align=right data-sort-value="0.64" | 640 m || 
|-id=039 bgcolor=#fefefe
| 534039 ||  || — || July 27, 2014 || Haleakala || Pan-STARRS ||  || align=right data-sort-value="0.71" | 710 m || 
|-id=040 bgcolor=#fefefe
| 534040 ||  || — || September 12, 2007 || Mount Lemmon || Mount Lemmon Survey ||  || align=right data-sort-value="0.62" | 620 m || 
|-id=041 bgcolor=#E9E9E9
| 534041 ||  || — || August 29, 2014 || Mount Lemmon || Mount Lemmon Survey || ADE || align=right | 1.9 km || 
|-id=042 bgcolor=#E9E9E9
| 534042 ||  || — || August 30, 2014 || Catalina || CSS ||  || align=right data-sort-value="0.90" | 900 m || 
|-id=043 bgcolor=#fefefe
| 534043 ||  || — || November 19, 2003 || Kitt Peak || Spacewatch ||  || align=right data-sort-value="0.78" | 780 m || 
|-id=044 bgcolor=#fefefe
| 534044 ||  || — || February 26, 2010 || WISE || WISE ||  || align=right | 2.0 km || 
|-id=045 bgcolor=#fefefe
| 534045 ||  || — || September 30, 2003 || Kitt Peak || Spacewatch ||  || align=right data-sort-value="0.68" | 680 m || 
|-id=046 bgcolor=#fefefe
| 534046 ||  || — || September 19, 2003 || Kitt Peak || Spacewatch ||  || align=right data-sort-value="0.75" | 750 m || 
|-id=047 bgcolor=#fefefe
| 534047 ||  || — || October 14, 2007 || Mount Lemmon || Mount Lemmon Survey ||  || align=right data-sort-value="0.60" | 600 m || 
|-id=048 bgcolor=#fefefe
| 534048 ||  || — || August 28, 2014 || Haleakala || Pan-STARRS ||  || align=right | 1.1 km || 
|-id=049 bgcolor=#fefefe
| 534049 ||  || — || September 12, 2007 || Kitt Peak || Spacewatch ||  || align=right data-sort-value="0.56" | 560 m || 
|-id=050 bgcolor=#fefefe
| 534050 ||  || — || September 14, 2007 || Mount Lemmon || Mount Lemmon Survey ||  || align=right data-sort-value="0.50" | 500 m || 
|-id=051 bgcolor=#fefefe
| 534051 ||  || — || May 31, 2014 || Haleakala || Pan-STARRS ||  || align=right data-sort-value="0.86" | 860 m || 
|-id=052 bgcolor=#E9E9E9
| 534052 ||  || — || May 31, 2014 || Haleakala || Pan-STARRS ||  || align=right | 1.3 km || 
|-id=053 bgcolor=#E9E9E9
| 534053 ||  || — || November 25, 2010 || Mount Lemmon || Mount Lemmon Survey ||  || align=right data-sort-value="0.80" | 800 m || 
|-id=054 bgcolor=#fefefe
| 534054 ||  || — || July 7, 2014 || Haleakala || Pan-STARRS ||  || align=right data-sort-value="0.69" | 690 m || 
|-id=055 bgcolor=#fefefe
| 534055 ||  || — || December 15, 2007 || Kitt Peak || Spacewatch ||  || align=right data-sort-value="0.75" | 750 m || 
|-id=056 bgcolor=#fefefe
| 534056 ||  || — || February 19, 2009 || Kitt Peak || Spacewatch ||  || align=right data-sort-value="0.83" | 830 m || 
|-id=057 bgcolor=#fefefe
| 534057 ||  || — || June 28, 2014 || Haleakala || Pan-STARRS ||  || align=right | 1.0 km || 
|-id=058 bgcolor=#fefefe
| 534058 ||  || — || July 7, 2014 || Haleakala || Pan-STARRS ||  || align=right data-sort-value="0.61" | 610 m || 
|-id=059 bgcolor=#fefefe
| 534059 ||  || — || August 20, 2014 || Haleakala || Pan-STARRS ||  || align=right data-sort-value="0.68" | 680 m || 
|-id=060 bgcolor=#fefefe
| 534060 ||  || — || July 31, 2014 || Haleakala || Pan-STARRS ||  || align=right data-sort-value="0.79" | 790 m || 
|-id=061 bgcolor=#fefefe
| 534061 ||  || — || January 18, 2005 || Kitt Peak || Spacewatch ||  || align=right data-sort-value="0.65" | 650 m || 
|-id=062 bgcolor=#fefefe
| 534062 ||  || — || September 11, 2010 || Mount Lemmon || Mount Lemmon Survey ||  || align=right data-sort-value="0.94" | 940 m || 
|-id=063 bgcolor=#fefefe
| 534063 ||  || — || August 3, 2014 || Haleakala || Pan-STARRS ||  || align=right data-sort-value="0.73" | 730 m || 
|-id=064 bgcolor=#fefefe
| 534064 ||  || — || October 19, 2003 || Kitt Peak || Spacewatch || V || align=right data-sort-value="0.49" | 490 m || 
|-id=065 bgcolor=#fefefe
| 534065 ||  || — || September 8, 2007 || Mount Lemmon || Mount Lemmon Survey ||  || align=right data-sort-value="0.64" | 640 m || 
|-id=066 bgcolor=#E9E9E9
| 534066 ||  || — || August 31, 2014 || Haleakala || Pan-STARRS ||  || align=right | 1.8 km || 
|-id=067 bgcolor=#E9E9E9
| 534067 ||  || — || March 6, 2008 || Mount Lemmon || Mount Lemmon Survey ||  || align=right data-sort-value="0.93" | 930 m || 
|-id=068 bgcolor=#fefefe
| 534068 ||  || — || May 12, 2013 || Haleakala || Pan-STARRS ||  || align=right data-sort-value="0.64" | 640 m || 
|-id=069 bgcolor=#fefefe
| 534069 ||  || — || January 18, 2008 || Mount Lemmon || Mount Lemmon Survey ||  || align=right data-sort-value="0.87" | 870 m || 
|-id=070 bgcolor=#E9E9E9
| 534070 ||  || — || January 11, 2011 || Catalina || CSS ||  || align=right | 1.3 km || 
|-id=071 bgcolor=#E9E9E9
| 534071 ||  || — || March 14, 2012 || Haleakala || Pan-STARRS ||  || align=right | 2.0 km || 
|-id=072 bgcolor=#E9E9E9
| 534072 ||  || — || December 1, 2006 || Kitt Peak || Spacewatch ||  || align=right data-sort-value="0.78" | 780 m || 
|-id=073 bgcolor=#C2E0FF
| 534073 ||  || — || October 6, 2012 || Haleakala || Pan-STARRS || SDO || align=right | 216 km || 
|-id=074 bgcolor=#C2E0FF
| 534074 ||  || — || September 4, 2011 || Haleakala || Pan-STARRS || res3:5 || align=right | 293 km || 
|-id=075 bgcolor=#fefefe
| 534075 ||  || — || October 15, 2007 || Mount Lemmon || Mount Lemmon Survey ||  || align=right data-sort-value="0.91" | 910 m || 
|-id=076 bgcolor=#fefefe
| 534076 ||  || — || August 23, 2014 || Haleakala || Pan-STARRS ||  || align=right data-sort-value="0.59" | 590 m || 
|-id=077 bgcolor=#fefefe
| 534077 ||  || — || November 2, 2007 || Mount Lemmon || Mount Lemmon Survey ||  || align=right data-sort-value="0.66" | 660 m || 
|-id=078 bgcolor=#fefefe
| 534078 ||  || — || May 9, 2006 || Mount Lemmon || Mount Lemmon Survey ||  || align=right data-sort-value="0.80" | 800 m || 
|-id=079 bgcolor=#E9E9E9
| 534079 ||  || — || October 21, 2006 || Catalina || CSS ||  || align=right | 1.2 km || 
|-id=080 bgcolor=#E9E9E9
| 534080 ||  || — || March 1, 2008 || Kitt Peak || Spacewatch ||  || align=right data-sort-value="0.81" | 810 m || 
|-id=081 bgcolor=#E9E9E9
| 534081 ||  || — || November 6, 2010 || Mount Lemmon || Mount Lemmon Survey ||  || align=right data-sort-value="0.80" | 800 m || 
|-id=082 bgcolor=#fefefe
| 534082 ||  || — || April 10, 2013 || Haleakala || Pan-STARRS ||  || align=right data-sort-value="0.64" | 640 m || 
|-id=083 bgcolor=#fefefe
| 534083 ||  || — || August 20, 2014 || Haleakala || Pan-STARRS ||  || align=right data-sort-value="0.71" | 710 m || 
|-id=084 bgcolor=#fefefe
| 534084 ||  || — || December 19, 2007 || Mount Lemmon || Mount Lemmon Survey ||  || align=right data-sort-value="0.99" | 990 m || 
|-id=085 bgcolor=#E9E9E9
| 534085 ||  || — || August 25, 2014 || Haleakala || Pan-STARRS ||  || align=right data-sort-value="0.94" | 940 m || 
|-id=086 bgcolor=#fefefe
| 534086 ||  || — || August 27, 2014 || Haleakala || Pan-STARRS ||  || align=right data-sort-value="0.57" | 570 m || 
|-id=087 bgcolor=#fefefe
| 534087 ||  || — || August 28, 2014 || Haleakala || Pan-STARRS ||  || align=right data-sort-value="0.81" | 810 m || 
|-id=088 bgcolor=#fefefe
| 534088 ||  || — || April 21, 2013 || Mount Lemmon || Mount Lemmon Survey ||  || align=right data-sort-value="0.69" | 690 m || 
|-id=089 bgcolor=#E9E9E9
| 534089 ||  || — || August 22, 2014 || Haleakala || Pan-STARRS ||  || align=right data-sort-value="0.98" | 980 m || 
|-id=090 bgcolor=#fefefe
| 534090 ||  || — || October 11, 2007 || Kitt Peak || Spacewatch ||  || align=right data-sort-value="0.79" | 790 m || 
|-id=091 bgcolor=#fefefe
| 534091 ||  || — || February 13, 2009 || Kitt Peak || Spacewatch ||  || align=right data-sort-value="0.53" | 530 m || 
|-id=092 bgcolor=#fefefe
| 534092 ||  || — || February 7, 2002 || Kitt Peak || Spacewatch ||  || align=right data-sort-value="0.70" | 700 m || 
|-id=093 bgcolor=#E9E9E9
| 534093 ||  || — || September 27, 2006 || Mount Lemmon || Mount Lemmon Survey ||  || align=right data-sort-value="0.83" | 830 m || 
|-id=094 bgcolor=#fefefe
| 534094 ||  || — || November 9, 2007 || Kitt Peak || Spacewatch ||  || align=right data-sort-value="0.78" | 780 m || 
|-id=095 bgcolor=#fefefe
| 534095 ||  || — || August 18, 2014 || Haleakala || Pan-STARRS ||  || align=right data-sort-value="0.60" | 600 m || 
|-id=096 bgcolor=#fefefe
| 534096 ||  || — || March 19, 2013 || Haleakala || Pan-STARRS ||  || align=right data-sort-value="0.80" | 800 m || 
|-id=097 bgcolor=#fefefe
| 534097 ||  || — || August 25, 2014 || Haleakala || Pan-STARRS ||  || align=right data-sort-value="0.75" | 750 m || 
|-id=098 bgcolor=#E9E9E9
| 534098 ||  || — || August 25, 2014 || Haleakala || Pan-STARRS ||  || align=right data-sort-value="0.86" | 860 m || 
|-id=099 bgcolor=#fefefe
| 534099 ||  || — || November 2, 2007 || Mount Lemmon || Mount Lemmon Survey ||  || align=right data-sort-value="0.73" | 730 m || 
|-id=100 bgcolor=#fefefe
| 534100 ||  || — || August 27, 2014 || Haleakala || Pan-STARRS ||  || align=right data-sort-value="0.62" | 620 m || 
|}

534101–534200 

|-bgcolor=#E9E9E9
| 534101 ||  || — || September 18, 2010 || Mount Lemmon || Mount Lemmon Survey ||  || align=right data-sort-value="0.78" | 780 m || 
|-id=102 bgcolor=#fefefe
| 534102 ||  || — || October 25, 2008 || Mount Lemmon || Mount Lemmon Survey ||  || align=right | 1.1 km || 
|-id=103 bgcolor=#E9E9E9
| 534103 ||  || — || August 30, 2014 || Haleakala || Pan-STARRS ||  || align=right data-sort-value="0.73" | 730 m || 
|-id=104 bgcolor=#E9E9E9
| 534104 ||  || — || August 30, 2014 || Haleakala || Pan-STARRS ||  || align=right data-sort-value="0.91" | 910 m || 
|-id=105 bgcolor=#E9E9E9
| 534105 ||  || — || March 5, 2008 || Kitt Peak || Spacewatch ||  || align=right data-sort-value="0.81" | 810 m || 
|-id=106 bgcolor=#fefefe
| 534106 ||  || — || December 26, 2011 || Mount Lemmon || Mount Lemmon Survey ||  || align=right data-sort-value="0.88" | 880 m || 
|-id=107 bgcolor=#E9E9E9
| 534107 ||  || — || August 31, 2014 || Haleakala || Pan-STARRS ||  || align=right | 1.4 km || 
|-id=108 bgcolor=#fefefe
| 534108 ||  || — || September 10, 2007 || Kitt Peak || Spacewatch ||  || align=right data-sort-value="0.85" | 850 m || 
|-id=109 bgcolor=#fefefe
| 534109 ||  || — || February 7, 2013 || Kitt Peak || Spacewatch ||  || align=right data-sort-value="0.58" | 580 m || 
|-id=110 bgcolor=#fefefe
| 534110 ||  || — || November 27, 2011 || Mount Lemmon || Mount Lemmon Survey ||  || align=right | 1.1 km || 
|-id=111 bgcolor=#fefefe
| 534111 ||  || — || October 24, 2011 || Haleakala || Pan-STARRS ||  || align=right data-sort-value="0.72" | 720 m || 
|-id=112 bgcolor=#E9E9E9
| 534112 ||  || — || May 3, 2005 || Kitt Peak || Spacewatch ||  || align=right data-sort-value="0.94" | 940 m || 
|-id=113 bgcolor=#fefefe
| 534113 ||  || — || September 11, 2007 || Mount Lemmon || Mount Lemmon Survey ||  || align=right data-sort-value="0.64" | 640 m || 
|-id=114 bgcolor=#fefefe
| 534114 ||  || — || October 15, 2007 || Kitt Peak || Spacewatch ||  || align=right data-sort-value="0.59" | 590 m || 
|-id=115 bgcolor=#fefefe
| 534115 ||  || — || November 23, 2003 || Kitt Peak || Spacewatch ||  || align=right data-sort-value="0.90" | 900 m || 
|-id=116 bgcolor=#fefefe
| 534116 ||  || — || September 13, 2007 || Mount Lemmon || Mount Lemmon Survey ||  || align=right data-sort-value="0.63" | 630 m || 
|-id=117 bgcolor=#fefefe
| 534117 ||  || — || April 24, 2006 || Kitt Peak || Spacewatch ||  || align=right data-sort-value="0.71" | 710 m || 
|-id=118 bgcolor=#fefefe
| 534118 ||  || — || January 16, 2005 || Kitt Peak || Spacewatch ||  || align=right data-sort-value="0.85" | 850 m || 
|-id=119 bgcolor=#fefefe
| 534119 ||  || — || January 29, 2009 || Mount Lemmon || Mount Lemmon Survey ||  || align=right data-sort-value="0.94" | 940 m || 
|-id=120 bgcolor=#fefefe
| 534120 ||  || — || April 4, 2010 || Catalina || CSS ||  || align=right data-sort-value="0.68" | 680 m || 
|-id=121 bgcolor=#fefefe
| 534121 ||  || — || December 22, 2008 || Kitt Peak || Spacewatch ||  || align=right data-sort-value="0.74" | 740 m || 
|-id=122 bgcolor=#fefefe
| 534122 ||  || — || September 27, 1992 || Kitt Peak || Spacewatch ||  || align=right data-sort-value="0.59" | 590 m || 
|-id=123 bgcolor=#fefefe
| 534123 ||  || — || November 26, 2003 || Kitt Peak || Spacewatch ||  || align=right data-sort-value="0.59" | 590 m || 
|-id=124 bgcolor=#fefefe
| 534124 ||  || — || December 3, 2007 || Kitt Peak || Spacewatch ||  || align=right data-sort-value="0.70" | 700 m || 
|-id=125 bgcolor=#fefefe
| 534125 ||  || — || July 7, 2014 || Haleakala || Pan-STARRS ||  || align=right data-sort-value="0.75" | 750 m || 
|-id=126 bgcolor=#fefefe
| 534126 ||  || — || December 19, 2007 || Kitt Peak || Spacewatch ||  || align=right data-sort-value="0.80" | 800 m || 
|-id=127 bgcolor=#fefefe
| 534127 ||  || — || October 28, 1997 || Kitt Peak || Spacewatch ||  || align=right data-sort-value="0.66" | 660 m || 
|-id=128 bgcolor=#fefefe
| 534128 ||  || — || October 11, 2007 || Mount Lemmon || Mount Lemmon Survey ||  || align=right data-sort-value="0.86" | 860 m || 
|-id=129 bgcolor=#fefefe
| 534129 ||  || — || February 4, 2005 || Mount Lemmon || Mount Lemmon Survey ||  || align=right data-sort-value="0.59" | 590 m || 
|-id=130 bgcolor=#E9E9E9
| 534130 ||  || — || August 30, 2014 || Haleakala || Pan-STARRS ||  || align=right data-sort-value="0.87" | 870 m || 
|-id=131 bgcolor=#fefefe
| 534131 ||  || — || August 20, 2014 || Haleakala || Pan-STARRS ||  || align=right data-sort-value="0.71" | 710 m || 
|-id=132 bgcolor=#fefefe
| 534132 ||  || — || August 25, 2014 || Haleakala || Pan-STARRS ||  || align=right data-sort-value="0.83" | 830 m || 
|-id=133 bgcolor=#fefefe
| 534133 ||  || — || August 30, 2014 || Haleakala || Pan-STARRS ||  || align=right data-sort-value="0.74" | 740 m || 
|-id=134 bgcolor=#fefefe
| 534134 ||  || — || November 12, 2007 || Mount Lemmon || Mount Lemmon Survey ||  || align=right data-sort-value="0.71" | 710 m || 
|-id=135 bgcolor=#E9E9E9
| 534135 ||  || — || August 10, 2010 || WISE || WISE ||  || align=right data-sort-value="0.90" | 900 m || 
|-id=136 bgcolor=#E9E9E9
| 534136 ||  || — || September 4, 2014 || Haleakala || Pan-STARRS ||  || align=right | 1.2 km || 
|-id=137 bgcolor=#fefefe
| 534137 ||  || — || December 30, 2011 || Mount Lemmon || Mount Lemmon Survey ||  || align=right data-sort-value="0.89" | 890 m || 
|-id=138 bgcolor=#fefefe
| 534138 ||  || — || January 18, 2012 || Mount Lemmon || Mount Lemmon Survey ||  || align=right data-sort-value="0.62" | 620 m || 
|-id=139 bgcolor=#fefefe
| 534139 ||  || — || September 13, 2014 || Haleakala || Pan-STARRS ||  || align=right | 1.1 km || 
|-id=140 bgcolor=#d6d6d6
| 534140 ||  || — || July 2, 2014 || Haleakala || Pan-STARRS || Tj (2.98) || align=right | 3.9 km || 
|-id=141 bgcolor=#E9E9E9
| 534141 ||  || — || November 2, 2010 || Kitt Peak || Spacewatch ||  || align=right | 1.0 km || 
|-id=142 bgcolor=#fefefe
| 534142 ||  || — || November 8, 2007 || Kitt Peak || Spacewatch ||  || align=right data-sort-value="0.59" | 590 m || 
|-id=143 bgcolor=#fefefe
| 534143 ||  || — || June 28, 2014 || Haleakala || Pan-STARRS ||  || align=right data-sort-value="0.64" | 640 m || 
|-id=144 bgcolor=#fefefe
| 534144 ||  || — || June 15, 2010 || Mount Lemmon || Mount Lemmon Survey ||  || align=right data-sort-value="0.85" | 850 m || 
|-id=145 bgcolor=#fefefe
| 534145 ||  || — || July 7, 2014 || Haleakala || Pan-STARRS ||  || align=right data-sort-value="0.76" | 760 m || 
|-id=146 bgcolor=#fefefe
| 534146 ||  || — || May 16, 2010 || La Sagra || OAM Obs. ||  || align=right data-sort-value="0.86" | 860 m || 
|-id=147 bgcolor=#fefefe
| 534147 ||  || — || February 14, 2012 || Haleakala || Pan-STARRS ||  || align=right data-sort-value="0.72" | 720 m || 
|-id=148 bgcolor=#fefefe
| 534148 ||  || — || September 28, 2003 || Kitt Peak || Spacewatch ||  || align=right data-sort-value="0.66" | 660 m || 
|-id=149 bgcolor=#fefefe
| 534149 ||  || — || September 19, 2003 || Kitt Peak || Spacewatch ||  || align=right data-sort-value="0.57" | 570 m || 
|-id=150 bgcolor=#fefefe
| 534150 ||  || — || September 13, 2007 || Mount Lemmon || Mount Lemmon Survey ||  || align=right data-sort-value="0.88" | 880 m || 
|-id=151 bgcolor=#fefefe
| 534151 ||  || — || September 11, 2007 || Kitt Peak || Spacewatch ||  || align=right data-sort-value="0.90" | 900 m || 
|-id=152 bgcolor=#fefefe
| 534152 ||  || — || April 8, 2006 || Kitt Peak || Spacewatch ||  || align=right data-sort-value="0.68" | 680 m || 
|-id=153 bgcolor=#fefefe
| 534153 ||  || — || September 19, 1995 || Kitt Peak || Spacewatch ||  || align=right data-sort-value="0.73" | 730 m || 
|-id=154 bgcolor=#fefefe
| 534154 ||  || — || July 29, 2014 || Haleakala || Pan-STARRS ||  || align=right data-sort-value="0.71" | 710 m || 
|-id=155 bgcolor=#fefefe
| 534155 ||  || — || July 4, 1995 || Kitt Peak || Spacewatch ||  || align=right data-sort-value="0.70" | 700 m || 
|-id=156 bgcolor=#fefefe
| 534156 ||  || — || January 1, 2008 || Kitt Peak || Spacewatch ||  || align=right data-sort-value="0.78" | 780 m || 
|-id=157 bgcolor=#fefefe
| 534157 ||  || — || November 3, 1999 || Kitt Peak || Spacewatch ||  || align=right data-sort-value="0.59" | 590 m || 
|-id=158 bgcolor=#fefefe
| 534158 ||  || — || July 27, 2014 || Haleakala || Pan-STARRS ||  || align=right data-sort-value="0.68" | 680 m || 
|-id=159 bgcolor=#fefefe
| 534159 ||  || — || April 10, 2010 || WISE || WISE ||  || align=right | 1.5 km || 
|-id=160 bgcolor=#E9E9E9
| 534160 ||  || — || October 22, 2006 || Mount Lemmon || Mount Lemmon Survey ||  || align=right | 1.2 km || 
|-id=161 bgcolor=#C2E0FF
| 534161 ||  || — || November 26, 2011 || Haleakala || Pan-STARRS || plutino || align=right | 151 km || 
|-id=162 bgcolor=#E9E9E9
| 534162 ||  || — || August 6, 2005 || Siding Spring || SSS ||  || align=right | 1.4 km || 
|-id=163 bgcolor=#fefefe
| 534163 ||  || — || September 4, 2014 || Haleakala || Pan-STARRS ||  || align=right data-sort-value="0.79" | 790 m || 
|-id=164 bgcolor=#E9E9E9
| 534164 ||  || — || October 5, 2005 || Catalina || CSS ||  || align=right | 1.6 km || 
|-id=165 bgcolor=#fefefe
| 534165 ||  || — || September 2, 2014 || Haleakala || Pan-STARRS ||  || align=right data-sort-value="0.74" | 740 m || 
|-id=166 bgcolor=#E9E9E9
| 534166 ||  || — || March 28, 2008 || Mount Lemmon || Mount Lemmon Survey ||  || align=right data-sort-value="0.80" | 800 m || 
|-id=167 bgcolor=#E9E9E9
| 534167 ||  || — || March 16, 2012 || Mount Lemmon || Mount Lemmon Survey ||  || align=right | 1.00 km || 
|-id=168 bgcolor=#E9E9E9
| 534168 ||  || — || March 6, 2008 || Mount Lemmon || Mount Lemmon Survey ||  || align=right | 1.1 km || 
|-id=169 bgcolor=#E9E9E9
| 534169 ||  || — || September 7, 2014 || Haleakala || Pan-STARRS ||  || align=right | 1.0 km || 
|-id=170 bgcolor=#E9E9E9
| 534170 ||  || — || June 1, 2009 || Mount Lemmon || Mount Lemmon Survey ||  || align=right | 1.0 km || 
|-id=171 bgcolor=#E9E9E9
| 534171 ||  || — || September 4, 2014 || Haleakala || Pan-STARRS ||  || align=right | 1.5 km || 
|-id=172 bgcolor=#E9E9E9
| 534172 ||  || — || November 16, 2006 || Mount Lemmon || Mount Lemmon Survey ||  || align=right | 1.1 km || 
|-id=173 bgcolor=#E9E9E9
| 534173 ||  || — || September 2, 2014 || Haleakala || Pan-STARRS ||  || align=right data-sort-value="0.70" | 700 m || 
|-id=174 bgcolor=#E9E9E9
| 534174 ||  || — || May 9, 2013 || Haleakala || Pan-STARRS ||  || align=right | 1.0 km || 
|-id=175 bgcolor=#E9E9E9
| 534175 ||  || — || September 13, 2014 || Haleakala || Pan-STARRS ||  || align=right data-sort-value="0.78" | 780 m || 
|-id=176 bgcolor=#fefefe
| 534176 ||  || — || April 26, 2006 || Kitt Peak || Spacewatch ||  || align=right data-sort-value="0.79" | 790 m || 
|-id=177 bgcolor=#fefefe
| 534177 ||  || — || September 2, 2014 || Haleakala || Pan-STARRS ||  || align=right data-sort-value="0.62" | 620 m || 
|-id=178 bgcolor=#E9E9E9
| 534178 ||  || — || July 27, 2010 || WISE || WISE ||  || align=right | 1.0 km || 
|-id=179 bgcolor=#fefefe
| 534179 ||  || — || September 14, 2014 || Mount Lemmon || Mount Lemmon Survey ||  || align=right data-sort-value="0.58" | 580 m || 
|-id=180 bgcolor=#fefefe
| 534180 ||  || — || September 14, 2014 || Haleakala || Pan-STARRS ||  || align=right data-sort-value="0.74" | 740 m || 
|-id=181 bgcolor=#FA8072
| 534181 ||  || — || August 28, 2014 || Haleakala || Pan-STARRS ||  || align=right | 2.2 km || 
|-id=182 bgcolor=#fefefe
| 534182 ||  || — || November 2, 2008 || Mount Lemmon || Mount Lemmon Survey ||  || align=right data-sort-value="0.55" | 550 m || 
|-id=183 bgcolor=#fefefe
| 534183 ||  || — || September 11, 2007 || Kitt Peak || Spacewatch ||  || align=right data-sort-value="0.51" | 510 m || 
|-id=184 bgcolor=#fefefe
| 534184 ||  || — || October 16, 2007 || Mount Lemmon || Mount Lemmon Survey ||  || align=right data-sort-value="0.53" | 530 m || 
|-id=185 bgcolor=#fefefe
| 534185 ||  || — || September 18, 2003 || Kitt Peak || Spacewatch ||  || align=right data-sort-value="0.61" | 610 m || 
|-id=186 bgcolor=#fefefe
| 534186 ||  || — || October 29, 2003 || Kitt Peak || Spacewatch ||  || align=right data-sort-value="0.81" | 810 m || 
|-id=187 bgcolor=#fefefe
| 534187 ||  || — || July 7, 2014 || Haleakala || Pan-STARRS ||  || align=right data-sort-value="0.75" | 750 m || 
|-id=188 bgcolor=#fefefe
| 534188 ||  || — || September 9, 2007 || Mount Lemmon || Mount Lemmon Survey ||  || align=right data-sort-value="0.63" | 630 m || 
|-id=189 bgcolor=#fefefe
| 534189 ||  || — || September 30, 2003 || Kitt Peak || Spacewatch ||  || align=right data-sort-value="0.62" | 620 m || 
|-id=190 bgcolor=#fefefe
| 534190 ||  || — || October 25, 2007 || Mount Lemmon || Mount Lemmon Survey ||  || align=right data-sort-value="0.64" | 640 m || 
|-id=191 bgcolor=#fefefe
| 534191 ||  || — || October 9, 2007 || Mount Lemmon || Mount Lemmon Survey ||  || align=right data-sort-value="0.67" | 670 m || 
|-id=192 bgcolor=#fefefe
| 534192 ||  || — || October 6, 2008 || Mount Lemmon || Mount Lemmon Survey ||  || align=right data-sort-value="0.66" | 660 m || 
|-id=193 bgcolor=#fefefe
| 534193 ||  || — || March 18, 2010 || Kitt Peak || Spacewatch ||  || align=right data-sort-value="0.63" | 630 m || 
|-id=194 bgcolor=#fefefe
| 534194 ||  || — || November 27, 2011 || Mount Lemmon || Mount Lemmon Survey ||  || align=right data-sort-value="0.60" | 600 m || 
|-id=195 bgcolor=#E9E9E9
| 534195 ||  || — || September 17, 2010 || Mount Lemmon || Mount Lemmon Survey ||  || align=right | 1.2 km || 
|-id=196 bgcolor=#fefefe
| 534196 ||  || — || January 19, 2012 || Mount Lemmon || Mount Lemmon Survey ||  || align=right data-sort-value="0.62" | 620 m || 
|-id=197 bgcolor=#fefefe
| 534197 ||  || — || September 18, 2014 || Haleakala || Pan-STARRS ||  || align=right data-sort-value="0.59" | 590 m || 
|-id=198 bgcolor=#E9E9E9
| 534198 ||  || — || August 28, 2014 || Haleakala || Pan-STARRS ||  || align=right data-sort-value="0.94" | 940 m || 
|-id=199 bgcolor=#fefefe
| 534199 ||  || — || December 20, 2007 || Mount Lemmon || Mount Lemmon Survey || V || align=right data-sort-value="0.56" | 560 m || 
|-id=200 bgcolor=#fefefe
| 534200 ||  || — || September 2, 2014 || Haleakala || Pan-STARRS ||  || align=right data-sort-value="0.65" | 650 m || 
|}

534201–534300 

|-bgcolor=#fefefe
| 534201 ||  || — || January 18, 2008 || Mount Lemmon || Mount Lemmon Survey || NYS || align=right data-sort-value="0.51" | 510 m || 
|-id=202 bgcolor=#fefefe
| 534202 ||  || — || February 1, 2008 || Mount Lemmon || Mount Lemmon Survey ||  || align=right data-sort-value="0.67" | 670 m || 
|-id=203 bgcolor=#fefefe
| 534203 ||  || — || October 22, 2003 || Kitt Peak || Spacewatch ||  || align=right data-sort-value="0.59" | 590 m || 
|-id=204 bgcolor=#fefefe
| 534204 ||  || — || March 23, 2006 || Catalina || CSS ||  || align=right data-sort-value="0.80" | 800 m || 
|-id=205 bgcolor=#fefefe
| 534205 ||  || — || October 9, 2007 || Mount Lemmon || Mount Lemmon Survey ||  || align=right data-sort-value="0.64" | 640 m || 
|-id=206 bgcolor=#fefefe
| 534206 ||  || — || January 2, 2012 || Kitt Peak || Spacewatch ||  || align=right data-sort-value="0.50" | 500 m || 
|-id=207 bgcolor=#E9E9E9
| 534207 ||  || — || July 29, 2010 || WISE || WISE ||  || align=right | 1.9 km || 
|-id=208 bgcolor=#fefefe
| 534208 ||  || — || September 24, 2007 || Kitt Peak || Spacewatch ||  || align=right data-sort-value="0.90" | 900 m || 
|-id=209 bgcolor=#fefefe
| 534209 ||  || — || May 4, 2006 || Mount Lemmon || Mount Lemmon Survey ||  || align=right data-sort-value="0.99" | 990 m || 
|-id=210 bgcolor=#fefefe
| 534210 ||  || — || January 11, 2008 || Kitt Peak || Spacewatch ||  || align=right data-sort-value="0.75" | 750 m || 
|-id=211 bgcolor=#fefefe
| 534211 ||  || — || September 14, 2014 || Kitt Peak || Spacewatch ||  || align=right data-sort-value="0.72" | 720 m || 
|-id=212 bgcolor=#fefefe
| 534212 ||  || — || August 19, 2010 || La Sagra || OAM Obs. || NYS || align=right data-sort-value="0.63" | 630 m || 
|-id=213 bgcolor=#fefefe
| 534213 ||  || — || September 19, 2014 || Haleakala || Pan-STARRS ||  || align=right data-sort-value="0.71" | 710 m || 
|-id=214 bgcolor=#fefefe
| 534214 ||  || — || August 25, 2014 || Haleakala || Pan-STARRS ||  || align=right data-sort-value="0.62" | 620 m || 
|-id=215 bgcolor=#fefefe
| 534215 ||  || — || August 24, 2007 || Kitt Peak || Spacewatch ||  || align=right data-sort-value="0.56" | 560 m || 
|-id=216 bgcolor=#fefefe
| 534216 ||  || — || October 23, 2003 || Kitt Peak || Spacewatch ||  || align=right data-sort-value="0.87" | 870 m || 
|-id=217 bgcolor=#E9E9E9
| 534217 ||  || — || September 25, 2006 || Catalina || CSS ||  || align=right | 1.1 km || 
|-id=218 bgcolor=#fefefe
| 534218 ||  || — || October 25, 2011 || Haleakala || Pan-STARRS ||  || align=right data-sort-value="0.75" | 750 m || 
|-id=219 bgcolor=#fefefe
| 534219 ||  || — || October 5, 2004 || Kitt Peak || Spacewatch ||  || align=right data-sort-value="0.49" | 490 m || 
|-id=220 bgcolor=#fefefe
| 534220 ||  || — || January 18, 2012 || Mount Lemmon || Mount Lemmon Survey ||  || align=right data-sort-value="0.61" | 610 m || 
|-id=221 bgcolor=#fefefe
| 534221 ||  || — || July 29, 2014 || Haleakala || Pan-STARRS ||  || align=right data-sort-value="0.63" | 630 m || 
|-id=222 bgcolor=#fefefe
| 534222 ||  || — || December 30, 2007 || Kitt Peak || Spacewatch ||  || align=right data-sort-value="0.71" | 710 m || 
|-id=223 bgcolor=#fefefe
| 534223 ||  || — || March 15, 2012 || Mount Lemmon || Mount Lemmon Survey ||  || align=right data-sort-value="0.94" | 940 m || 
|-id=224 bgcolor=#fefefe
| 534224 ||  || — || March 12, 2013 || Kitt Peak || Spacewatch ||  || align=right data-sort-value="0.73" | 730 m || 
|-id=225 bgcolor=#E9E9E9
| 534225 ||  || — || August 29, 2005 || Kitt Peak || Spacewatch ||  || align=right | 1.4 km || 
|-id=226 bgcolor=#E9E9E9
| 534226 ||  || — || November 17, 2006 || Mount Lemmon || Mount Lemmon Survey ||  || align=right data-sort-value="0.86" | 860 m || 
|-id=227 bgcolor=#fefefe
| 534227 ||  || — || February 22, 2012 || Kitt Peak || Spacewatch ||  || align=right data-sort-value="0.68" | 680 m || 
|-id=228 bgcolor=#E9E9E9
| 534228 ||  || — || August 31, 2014 || Haleakala || Pan-STARRS ||  || align=right data-sort-value="0.72" | 720 m || 
|-id=229 bgcolor=#E9E9E9
| 534229 ||  || — || March 9, 1995 || Kitt Peak || Spacewatch ||  || align=right | 1.0 km || 
|-id=230 bgcolor=#E9E9E9
| 534230 ||  || — || December 2, 2010 || Catalina || CSS ||  || align=right data-sort-value="0.95" | 950 m || 
|-id=231 bgcolor=#fefefe
| 534231 ||  || — || January 26, 2012 || Mount Lemmon || Mount Lemmon Survey ||  || align=right data-sort-value="0.62" | 620 m || 
|-id=232 bgcolor=#E9E9E9
| 534232 ||  || — || September 20, 2014 || Haleakala || Pan-STARRS ||  || align=right data-sort-value="0.86" | 860 m || 
|-id=233 bgcolor=#fefefe
| 534233 ||  || — || November 8, 2007 || Mount Lemmon || Mount Lemmon Survey ||  || align=right data-sort-value="0.70" | 700 m || 
|-id=234 bgcolor=#E9E9E9
| 534234 ||  || — || December 14, 2010 || Mount Lemmon || Mount Lemmon Survey ||  || align=right data-sort-value="0.86" | 860 m || 
|-id=235 bgcolor=#E9E9E9
| 534235 ||  || — || September 20, 2014 || Haleakala || Pan-STARRS ||  || align=right data-sort-value="0.80" | 800 m || 
|-id=236 bgcolor=#fefefe
| 534236 ||  || — || January 2, 2001 || Socorro || LINEAR ||  || align=right data-sort-value="0.63" | 630 m || 
|-id=237 bgcolor=#E9E9E9
| 534237 ||  || — || September 20, 2014 || Haleakala || Pan-STARRS ||  || align=right data-sort-value="0.91" | 910 m || 
|-id=238 bgcolor=#E9E9E9
| 534238 ||  || — || November 20, 2001 || Socorro || LINEAR ||  || align=right | 1.8 km || 
|-id=239 bgcolor=#fefefe
| 534239 ||  || — || January 19, 2004 || Kitt Peak || Spacewatch ||  || align=right data-sort-value="0.70" | 700 m || 
|-id=240 bgcolor=#E9E9E9
| 534240 ||  || — || July 1, 2005 || Kitt Peak || Spacewatch ||  || align=right | 1.1 km || 
|-id=241 bgcolor=#E9E9E9
| 534241 ||  || — || December 6, 2010 || Mount Lemmon || Mount Lemmon Survey ||  || align=right data-sort-value="0.98" | 980 m || 
|-id=242 bgcolor=#E9E9E9
| 534242 ||  || — || September 20, 2014 || Haleakala || Pan-STARRS ||  || align=right | 1.6 km || 
|-id=243 bgcolor=#fefefe
| 534243 ||  || — || December 19, 2003 || Kitt Peak || Spacewatch ||  || align=right data-sort-value="0.86" | 860 m || 
|-id=244 bgcolor=#E9E9E9
| 534244 ||  || — || September 4, 2014 || Haleakala || Pan-STARRS ||  || align=right data-sort-value="0.95" | 950 m || 
|-id=245 bgcolor=#FA8072
| 534245 ||  || — || April 6, 2013 || Mount Lemmon || Mount Lemmon Survey ||  || align=right | 1.1 km || 
|-id=246 bgcolor=#E9E9E9
| 534246 ||  || — || December 15, 2010 || Mount Lemmon || Mount Lemmon Survey ||  || align=right | 1.5 km || 
|-id=247 bgcolor=#fefefe
| 534247 ||  || — || August 30, 2014 || Haleakala || Pan-STARRS || (2076) || align=right data-sort-value="0.74" | 740 m || 
|-id=248 bgcolor=#E9E9E9
| 534248 ||  || — || October 2, 2006 || Mount Lemmon || Mount Lemmon Survey ||  || align=right data-sort-value="0.59" | 590 m || 
|-id=249 bgcolor=#fefefe
| 534249 ||  || — || January 11, 2008 || Mount Lemmon || Mount Lemmon Survey ||  || align=right data-sort-value="0.71" | 710 m || 
|-id=250 bgcolor=#fefefe
| 534250 ||  || — || September 2, 2014 || Haleakala || Pan-STARRS ||  || align=right data-sort-value="0.74" | 740 m || 
|-id=251 bgcolor=#C7FF8F
| 534251 ||  || — || August 9, 2013 || Haleakala || Pan-STARRS || centaur || align=right | 11 km || 
|-id=252 bgcolor=#fefefe
| 534252 ||  || — || August 25, 2014 || Haleakala || Pan-STARRS || NYS || align=right data-sort-value="0.54" | 540 m || 
|-id=253 bgcolor=#fefefe
| 534253 ||  || — || January 21, 2012 || Kitt Peak || Spacewatch ||  || align=right data-sort-value="0.68" | 680 m || 
|-id=254 bgcolor=#fefefe
| 534254 ||  || — || December 3, 2004 || Kitt Peak || Spacewatch ||  || align=right data-sort-value="0.57" | 570 m || 
|-id=255 bgcolor=#E9E9E9
| 534255 ||  || — || December 12, 2006 || Kitt Peak || Spacewatch ||  || align=right | 1.0 km || 
|-id=256 bgcolor=#fefefe
| 534256 ||  || — || July 31, 2014 || Haleakala || Pan-STARRS ||  || align=right data-sort-value="0.72" | 720 m || 
|-id=257 bgcolor=#fefefe
| 534257 ||  || — || January 22, 2012 || Haleakala || Pan-STARRS ||  || align=right data-sort-value="0.85" | 850 m || 
|-id=258 bgcolor=#fefefe
| 534258 ||  || — || August 6, 2014 || Haleakala || Pan-STARRS ||  || align=right data-sort-value="0.87" | 870 m || 
|-id=259 bgcolor=#fefefe
| 534259 ||  || — || October 20, 2003 || Kitt Peak || Spacewatch ||  || align=right data-sort-value="0.77" | 770 m || 
|-id=260 bgcolor=#E9E9E9
| 534260 ||  || — || October 31, 2010 || Kitt Peak || Spacewatch ||  || align=right | 1.00 km || 
|-id=261 bgcolor=#fefefe
| 534261 ||  || — || August 25, 2014 || Haleakala || Pan-STARRS ||  || align=right data-sort-value="0.90" | 900 m || 
|-id=262 bgcolor=#fefefe
| 534262 ||  || — || August 28, 2006 || Catalina || CSS ||  || align=right data-sort-value="0.63" | 630 m || 
|-id=263 bgcolor=#fefefe
| 534263 ||  || — || June 10, 2010 || Mount Lemmon || Mount Lemmon Survey ||  || align=right data-sort-value="0.80" | 800 m || 
|-id=264 bgcolor=#E9E9E9
| 534264 ||  || — || April 29, 2009 || Kitt Peak || Spacewatch ||  || align=right | 1.8 km || 
|-id=265 bgcolor=#fefefe
| 534265 ||  || — || September 11, 2007 || Catalina || CSS ||  || align=right data-sort-value="0.87" | 870 m || 
|-id=266 bgcolor=#fefefe
| 534266 ||  || — || June 27, 2014 || Haleakala || Pan-STARRS ||  || align=right data-sort-value="0.82" | 820 m || 
|-id=267 bgcolor=#fefefe
| 534267 ||  || — || December 30, 2007 || Mount Lemmon || Mount Lemmon Survey ||  || align=right data-sort-value="0.68" | 680 m || 
|-id=268 bgcolor=#E9E9E9
| 534268 ||  || — || October 3, 2006 || Mount Lemmon || Mount Lemmon Survey ||  || align=right data-sort-value="0.65" | 650 m || 
|-id=269 bgcolor=#fefefe
| 534269 ||  || — || December 18, 2007 || Mount Lemmon || Mount Lemmon Survey ||  || align=right data-sort-value="0.80" | 800 m || 
|-id=270 bgcolor=#fefefe
| 534270 ||  || — || February 16, 2012 || Haleakala || Pan-STARRS || NYS || align=right data-sort-value="0.68" | 680 m || 
|-id=271 bgcolor=#E9E9E9
| 534271 ||  || — || August 30, 2014 || Haleakala || Pan-STARRS || EUN || align=right | 1.2 km || 
|-id=272 bgcolor=#E9E9E9
| 534272 ||  || — || October 7, 2010 || Mount Lemmon || Mount Lemmon Survey ||  || align=right | 1.8 km || 
|-id=273 bgcolor=#fefefe
| 534273 ||  || — || November 10, 1999 || Kitt Peak || Spacewatch ||  || align=right data-sort-value="0.76" | 760 m || 
|-id=274 bgcolor=#fefefe
| 534274 ||  || — || August 31, 2014 || Kitt Peak || Spacewatch ||  || align=right data-sort-value="0.80" | 800 m || 
|-id=275 bgcolor=#fefefe
| 534275 ||  || — || March 2, 2005 || Kitt Peak || Spacewatch ||  || align=right data-sort-value="0.74" | 740 m || 
|-id=276 bgcolor=#fefefe
| 534276 ||  || — || December 10, 2004 || Socorro || LINEAR ||  || align=right data-sort-value="0.59" | 590 m || 
|-id=277 bgcolor=#fefefe
| 534277 ||  || — || June 3, 2014 || Haleakala || Pan-STARRS ||  || align=right data-sort-value="0.85" | 850 m || 
|-id=278 bgcolor=#E9E9E9
| 534278 ||  || — || September 5, 2010 || Mount Lemmon || Mount Lemmon Survey ||  || align=right data-sort-value="0.90" | 900 m || 
|-id=279 bgcolor=#E9E9E9
| 534279 ||  || — || October 1, 2010 || La Sagra || OAM Obs. ||  || align=right | 1.3 km || 
|-id=280 bgcolor=#fefefe
| 534280 ||  || — || December 22, 2008 || Kitt Peak || Spacewatch ||  || align=right data-sort-value="0.94" | 940 m || 
|-id=281 bgcolor=#E9E9E9
| 534281 ||  || — || June 17, 2010 || Mount Lemmon || Mount Lemmon Survey ||  || align=right | 1.1 km || 
|-id=282 bgcolor=#E9E9E9
| 534282 ||  || — || September 10, 2010 || Mount Lemmon || Mount Lemmon Survey ||  || align=right | 1.4 km || 
|-id=283 bgcolor=#E9E9E9
| 534283 ||  || — || January 17, 2007 || Kitt Peak || Spacewatch ||  || align=right data-sort-value="0.77" | 770 m || 
|-id=284 bgcolor=#fefefe
| 534284 ||  || — || September 25, 2014 || Kitt Peak || Spacewatch ||  || align=right data-sort-value="0.94" | 940 m || 
|-id=285 bgcolor=#E9E9E9
| 534285 ||  || — || December 13, 2006 || Kitt Peak || Spacewatch ||  || align=right data-sort-value="0.71" | 710 m || 
|-id=286 bgcolor=#fefefe
| 534286 ||  || — || February 25, 2012 || Kitt Peak || Spacewatch ||  || align=right data-sort-value="0.78" | 780 m || 
|-id=287 bgcolor=#E9E9E9
| 534287 ||  || — || August 12, 2010 || Kitt Peak || Spacewatch || EUN || align=right | 1.1 km || 
|-id=288 bgcolor=#E9E9E9
| 534288 ||  || — || September 25, 2014 || Kitt Peak || Spacewatch ||  || align=right | 1.3 km || 
|-id=289 bgcolor=#E9E9E9
| 534289 ||  || — || November 14, 2010 || Mount Lemmon || Mount Lemmon Survey ||  || align=right data-sort-value="0.86" | 860 m || 
|-id=290 bgcolor=#fefefe
| 534290 ||  || — || September 24, 2014 || Mount Lemmon || Mount Lemmon Survey ||  || align=right data-sort-value="0.68" | 680 m || 
|-id=291 bgcolor=#E9E9E9
| 534291 ||  || — || October 4, 2006 || Mount Lemmon || Mount Lemmon Survey ||  || align=right data-sort-value="0.57" | 570 m || 
|-id=292 bgcolor=#E9E9E9
| 534292 ||  || — || May 12, 2013 || Haleakala || Pan-STARRS ||  || align=right | 1.4 km || 
|-id=293 bgcolor=#fefefe
| 534293 ||  || — || April 8, 2013 || Mount Lemmon || Mount Lemmon Survey ||  || align=right data-sort-value="0.74" | 740 m || 
|-id=294 bgcolor=#E9E9E9
| 534294 ||  || — || September 24, 2014 || Mount Lemmon || Mount Lemmon Survey ||  || align=right | 1.4 km || 
|-id=295 bgcolor=#fefefe
| 534295 ||  || — || October 1, 2010 || Mount Lemmon || Mount Lemmon Survey ||  || align=right | 1.1 km || 
|-id=296 bgcolor=#E9E9E9
| 534296 ||  || — || December 14, 2010 || Mount Lemmon || Mount Lemmon Survey || (5) || align=right data-sort-value="0.81" | 810 m || 
|-id=297 bgcolor=#fefefe
| 534297 ||  || — || May 31, 2006 || Mount Lemmon || Mount Lemmon Survey ||  || align=right data-sort-value="0.94" | 940 m || 
|-id=298 bgcolor=#fefefe
| 534298 ||  || — || October 13, 2010 || Kitt Peak || Spacewatch ||  || align=right data-sort-value="0.59" | 590 m || 
|-id=299 bgcolor=#fefefe
| 534299 Parazynski ||  ||  || April 16, 2010 || WISE || WISE ||  || align=right | 1.4 km || 
|-id=300 bgcolor=#d6d6d6
| 534300 ||  || — || September 21, 2003 || Kitt Peak || Spacewatch ||  || align=right | 3.1 km || 
|}

534301–534400 

|-bgcolor=#fefefe
| 534301 ||  || — || September 30, 2003 || Kitt Peak || Spacewatch ||  || align=right data-sort-value="0.64" | 640 m || 
|-id=302 bgcolor=#fefefe
| 534302 ||  || — || August 29, 2006 || Kitt Peak || Spacewatch ||  || align=right data-sort-value="0.65" | 650 m || 
|-id=303 bgcolor=#E9E9E9
| 534303 ||  || — || October 13, 2010 || Mount Lemmon || Mount Lemmon Survey ||  || align=right data-sort-value="0.90" | 900 m || 
|-id=304 bgcolor=#fefefe
| 534304 ||  || — || September 17, 2010 || Mount Lemmon || Mount Lemmon Survey ||  || align=right data-sort-value="0.61" | 610 m || 
|-id=305 bgcolor=#E9E9E9
| 534305 ||  || — || September 28, 2006 || Mount Lemmon || Mount Lemmon Survey ||  || align=right data-sort-value="0.68" | 680 m || 
|-id=306 bgcolor=#E9E9E9
| 534306 ||  || — || October 17, 2010 || Mount Lemmon || Mount Lemmon Survey ||  || align=right data-sort-value="0.82" | 820 m || 
|-id=307 bgcolor=#E9E9E9
| 534307 ||  || — || September 2, 2014 || Haleakala || Pan-STARRS ||  || align=right data-sort-value="0.83" | 830 m || 
|-id=308 bgcolor=#fefefe
| 534308 ||  || — || December 30, 2007 || Kitt Peak || Spacewatch ||  || align=right data-sort-value="0.72" | 720 m || 
|-id=309 bgcolor=#E9E9E9
| 534309 ||  || — || March 31, 2004 || Kitt Peak || Spacewatch ||  || align=right | 1.2 km || 
|-id=310 bgcolor=#E9E9E9
| 534310 ||  || — || October 20, 2006 || Kitt Peak || Spacewatch ||  || align=right data-sort-value="0.88" | 880 m || 
|-id=311 bgcolor=#E9E9E9
| 534311 ||  || — || October 19, 2006 || Mount Lemmon || Mount Lemmon Survey ||  || align=right data-sort-value="0.90" | 900 m || 
|-id=312 bgcolor=#fefefe
| 534312 ||  || — || March 21, 2009 || Mount Lemmon || Mount Lemmon Survey ||  || align=right data-sort-value="0.88" | 880 m || 
|-id=313 bgcolor=#fefefe
| 534313 ||  || — || September 3, 2010 || Mount Lemmon || Mount Lemmon Survey ||  || align=right data-sort-value="0.66" | 660 m || 
|-id=314 bgcolor=#C2E0FF
| 534314 ||  || — || October 15, 2010 || Haleakala || Pan-STARRS || res3:5 || align=right | 162 km || 
|-id=315 bgcolor=#C2E0FF
| 534315 ||  || — || September 27, 2010 || Haleakala || Pan-STARRS || plutino || align=right | 118 km || 
|-id=316 bgcolor=#fefefe
| 534316 ||  || — || January 16, 2005 || Kitt Peak || Spacewatch ||  || align=right data-sort-value="0.61" | 610 m || 
|-id=317 bgcolor=#E9E9E9
| 534317 ||  || — || November 17, 2006 || Mount Lemmon || Mount Lemmon Survey ||  || align=right | 1.2 km || 
|-id=318 bgcolor=#E9E9E9
| 534318 ||  || — || January 10, 2007 || Mount Lemmon || Mount Lemmon Survey ||  || align=right data-sort-value="0.98" | 980 m || 
|-id=319 bgcolor=#E9E9E9
| 534319 ||  || — || March 28, 2012 || Haleakala || Pan-STARRS ||  || align=right | 1.2 km || 
|-id=320 bgcolor=#E9E9E9
| 534320 ||  || — || February 9, 2008 || Mount Lemmon || Mount Lemmon Survey ||  || align=right | 1.3 km || 
|-id=321 bgcolor=#E9E9E9
| 534321 ||  || — || October 17, 2010 || Mount Lemmon || Mount Lemmon Survey ||  || align=right data-sort-value="0.90" | 900 m || 
|-id=322 bgcolor=#fefefe
| 534322 ||  || — || April 7, 2013 || Mount Lemmon || Mount Lemmon Survey ||  || align=right data-sort-value="0.71" | 710 m || 
|-id=323 bgcolor=#E9E9E9
| 534323 ||  || — || February 27, 2012 || Haleakala || Pan-STARRS ||  || align=right | 1.4 km || 
|-id=324 bgcolor=#E9E9E9
| 534324 ||  || — || July 14, 2013 || Haleakala || Pan-STARRS ||  || align=right | 1.6 km || 
|-id=325 bgcolor=#fefefe
| 534325 ||  || — || September 3, 2010 || Mount Lemmon || Mount Lemmon Survey ||  || align=right data-sort-value="0.86" | 860 m || 
|-id=326 bgcolor=#E9E9E9
| 534326 ||  || — || September 18, 2014 || Haleakala || Pan-STARRS ||  || align=right data-sort-value="0.88" | 880 m || 
|-id=327 bgcolor=#E9E9E9
| 534327 ||  || — || September 20, 2014 || Haleakala || Pan-STARRS ||  || align=right data-sort-value="0.87" | 870 m || 
|-id=328 bgcolor=#E9E9E9
| 534328 ||  || — || November 10, 2010 || Mount Lemmon || Mount Lemmon Survey ||  || align=right | 1.2 km || 
|-id=329 bgcolor=#E9E9E9
| 534329 ||  || — || September 20, 2014 || Haleakala || Pan-STARRS ||  || align=right | 1.3 km || 
|-id=330 bgcolor=#E9E9E9
| 534330 ||  || — || June 30, 2013 || Haleakala || Pan-STARRS ||  || align=right | 1.2 km || 
|-id=331 bgcolor=#E9E9E9
| 534331 ||  || — || September 24, 2005 || Kitt Peak || Spacewatch ||  || align=right | 1.1 km || 
|-id=332 bgcolor=#E9E9E9
| 534332 ||  || — || March 28, 2012 || Haleakala || Pan-STARRS ||  || align=right | 1.9 km || 
|-id=333 bgcolor=#E9E9E9
| 534333 ||  || — || September 28, 2006 || Mount Lemmon || Mount Lemmon Survey ||  || align=right data-sort-value="0.71" | 710 m || 
|-id=334 bgcolor=#E9E9E9
| 534334 ||  || — || November 5, 2010 || Mount Lemmon || Mount Lemmon Survey ||  || align=right data-sort-value="0.75" | 750 m || 
|-id=335 bgcolor=#E9E9E9
| 534335 ||  || — || February 25, 2012 || Kitt Peak || Spacewatch ||  || align=right | 1.0 km || 
|-id=336 bgcolor=#E9E9E9
| 534336 ||  || — || October 29, 2010 || Mount Lemmon || Mount Lemmon Survey ||  || align=right | 1.1 km || 
|-id=337 bgcolor=#fefefe
| 534337 ||  || — || March 31, 2013 || Mount Lemmon || Mount Lemmon Survey ||  || align=right data-sort-value="0.67" | 670 m || 
|-id=338 bgcolor=#fefefe
| 534338 ||  || — || April 16, 2013 || Haleakala || Pan-STARRS ||  || align=right data-sort-value="0.77" | 770 m || 
|-id=339 bgcolor=#E9E9E9
| 534339 ||  || — || October 1, 2014 || Kitt Peak || Spacewatch ||  || align=right data-sort-value="0.86" | 860 m || 
|-id=340 bgcolor=#E9E9E9
| 534340 ||  || — || November 25, 2006 || Mount Lemmon || Mount Lemmon Survey ||  || align=right | 1.2 km || 
|-id=341 bgcolor=#E9E9E9
| 534341 ||  || — || September 2, 2014 || Haleakala || Pan-STARRS ||  || align=right | 1.3 km || 
|-id=342 bgcolor=#E9E9E9
| 534342 ||  || — || July 28, 2014 || Haleakala || Pan-STARRS ||  || align=right | 1.1 km || 
|-id=343 bgcolor=#E9E9E9
| 534343 ||  || — || November 13, 2006 || Kitt Peak || Spacewatch ||  || align=right data-sort-value="0.92" | 920 m || 
|-id=344 bgcolor=#E9E9E9
| 534344 ||  || — || January 17, 2007 || Kitt Peak || Spacewatch ||  || align=right | 1.3 km || 
|-id=345 bgcolor=#E9E9E9
| 534345 ||  || — || October 4, 2014 || Haleakala || Pan-STARRS ||  || align=right | 3.5 km || 
|-id=346 bgcolor=#E9E9E9
| 534346 ||  || — || September 2, 2014 || Haleakala || Pan-STARRS ||  || align=right | 1.2 km || 
|-id=347 bgcolor=#fefefe
| 534347 ||  || — || November 19, 2007 || Mount Lemmon || Mount Lemmon Survey ||  || align=right data-sort-value="0.44" | 440 m || 
|-id=348 bgcolor=#E9E9E9
| 534348 ||  || — || September 11, 2010 || Mount Lemmon || Mount Lemmon Survey ||  || align=right data-sort-value="0.78" | 780 m || 
|-id=349 bgcolor=#fefefe
| 534349 ||  || — || September 16, 2003 || Kitt Peak || Spacewatch ||  || align=right data-sort-value="0.65" | 650 m || 
|-id=350 bgcolor=#E9E9E9
| 534350 ||  || — || September 19, 2006 || Kitt Peak || Spacewatch ||  || align=right data-sort-value="0.98" | 980 m || 
|-id=351 bgcolor=#fefefe
| 534351 ||  || — || November 26, 2003 || Kitt Peak || Spacewatch ||  || align=right data-sort-value="0.58" | 580 m || 
|-id=352 bgcolor=#fefefe
| 534352 ||  || — || September 2, 2014 || Haleakala || Pan-STARRS ||  || align=right data-sort-value="0.60" | 600 m || 
|-id=353 bgcolor=#E9E9E9
| 534353 ||  || — || October 2, 2014 || Haleakala || Pan-STARRS ||  || align=right data-sort-value="0.90" | 900 m || 
|-id=354 bgcolor=#fefefe
| 534354 ||  || — || December 27, 2011 || Kitt Peak || Spacewatch ||  || align=right data-sort-value="0.50" | 500 m || 
|-id=355 bgcolor=#E9E9E9
| 534355 ||  || — || October 1, 2014 || Catalina || CSS ||  || align=right | 1.3 km || 
|-id=356 bgcolor=#E9E9E9
| 534356 ||  || — || August 31, 2014 || Haleakala || Pan-STARRS ||  || align=right | 1.3 km || 
|-id=357 bgcolor=#fefefe
| 534357 ||  || — || May 13, 2010 || WISE || WISE ||  || align=right data-sort-value="0.79" | 790 m || 
|-id=358 bgcolor=#fefefe
| 534358 ||  || — || November 10, 2004 || Kitt Peak || Spacewatch ||  || align=right data-sort-value="0.77" | 770 m || 
|-id=359 bgcolor=#E9E9E9
| 534359 ||  || — || December 25, 2010 || Mount Lemmon || Mount Lemmon Survey ||  || align=right | 1.5 km || 
|-id=360 bgcolor=#E9E9E9
| 534360 ||  || — || March 15, 2012 || Mount Lemmon || Mount Lemmon Survey ||  || align=right data-sort-value="0.84" | 840 m || 
|-id=361 bgcolor=#fefefe
| 534361 ||  || — || September 22, 2003 || Kitt Peak || Spacewatch ||  || align=right data-sort-value="0.72" | 720 m || 
|-id=362 bgcolor=#E9E9E9
| 534362 ||  || — || April 13, 1996 || Kitt Peak || Spacewatch ||  || align=right data-sort-value="0.90" | 900 m || 
|-id=363 bgcolor=#E9E9E9
| 534363 ||  || — || October 2, 2014 || Kitt Peak || Spacewatch ||  || align=right | 1.2 km || 
|-id=364 bgcolor=#fefefe
| 534364 ||  || — || September 24, 2014 || Kitt Peak || Spacewatch ||  || align=right data-sort-value="0.81" | 810 m || 
|-id=365 bgcolor=#E9E9E9
| 534365 ||  || — || March 6, 2008 || Mount Lemmon || Mount Lemmon Survey ||  || align=right data-sort-value="0.92" | 920 m || 
|-id=366 bgcolor=#E9E9E9
| 534366 ||  || — || March 29, 2012 || Kitt Peak || Spacewatch ||  || align=right | 1.8 km || 
|-id=367 bgcolor=#fefefe
| 534367 ||  || — || December 4, 2007 || Mount Lemmon || Mount Lemmon Survey ||  || align=right data-sort-value="0.51" | 510 m || 
|-id=368 bgcolor=#E9E9E9
| 534368 ||  || — || August 30, 2005 || Campo Imperatore || CINEOS ||  || align=right | 1.9 km || 
|-id=369 bgcolor=#fefefe
| 534369 ||  || — || May 23, 2006 || Mount Lemmon || Mount Lemmon Survey ||  || align=right data-sort-value="0.75" | 750 m || 
|-id=370 bgcolor=#fefefe
| 534370 ||  || — || March 24, 2012 || Mount Lemmon || Mount Lemmon Survey ||  || align=right data-sort-value="0.57" | 570 m || 
|-id=371 bgcolor=#E9E9E9
| 534371 ||  || — || February 17, 2007 || Kitt Peak || Spacewatch ||  || align=right | 2.4 km || 
|-id=372 bgcolor=#E9E9E9
| 534372 ||  || — || December 14, 2010 || Mount Lemmon || Mount Lemmon Survey ||  || align=right | 1.2 km || 
|-id=373 bgcolor=#C2FFFF
| 534373 ||  || — || October 5, 2014 || Haleakala || Pan-STARRS || L5 || align=right | 9.9 km || 
|-id=374 bgcolor=#E9E9E9
| 534374 ||  || — || August 31, 2014 || Catalina || CSS ||  || align=right | 1.1 km || 
|-id=375 bgcolor=#E9E9E9
| 534375 ||  || — || October 14, 2014 || Kitt Peak || Spacewatch ||  || align=right | 1.2 km || 
|-id=376 bgcolor=#E9E9E9
| 534376 ||  || — || April 29, 2008 || Mount Lemmon || Mount Lemmon Survey ||  || align=right | 1.2 km || 
|-id=377 bgcolor=#fefefe
| 534377 ||  || — || September 4, 2010 || Mount Lemmon || Mount Lemmon Survey ||  || align=right data-sort-value="0.66" | 660 m || 
|-id=378 bgcolor=#E9E9E9
| 534378 ||  || — || October 13, 2010 || Mount Lemmon || Mount Lemmon Survey ||  || align=right data-sort-value="0.54" | 540 m || 
|-id=379 bgcolor=#E9E9E9
| 534379 ||  || — || October 23, 2006 || Mount Lemmon || Mount Lemmon Survey ||  || align=right data-sort-value="0.85" | 850 m || 
|-id=380 bgcolor=#E9E9E9
| 534380 ||  || — || October 19, 2006 || Mount Lemmon || Mount Lemmon Survey ||  || align=right data-sort-value="0.75" | 750 m || 
|-id=381 bgcolor=#E9E9E9
| 534381 ||  || — || August 29, 2014 || Mount Lemmon || Mount Lemmon Survey ||  || align=right | 1.2 km || 
|-id=382 bgcolor=#E9E9E9
| 534382 ||  || — || September 29, 1997 || Kitt Peak || Spacewatch ||  || align=right | 1.4 km || 
|-id=383 bgcolor=#E9E9E9
| 534383 ||  || — || October 2, 1997 || Caussols || ODAS ||  || align=right | 1.3 km || 
|-id=384 bgcolor=#fefefe
| 534384 ||  || — || April 22, 2010 || WISE || WISE ||  || align=right | 1.9 km || 
|-id=385 bgcolor=#E9E9E9
| 534385 ||  || — || November 11, 2010 || Catalina || CSS ||  || align=right data-sort-value="0.94" | 940 m || 
|-id=386 bgcolor=#E9E9E9
| 534386 ||  || — || August 31, 2014 || Haleakala || Pan-STARRS ||  || align=right | 1.2 km || 
|-id=387 bgcolor=#E9E9E9
| 534387 ||  || — || November 27, 2010 || Catalina || CSS ||  || align=right | 1.4 km || 
|-id=388 bgcolor=#fefefe
| 534388 ||  || — || November 3, 2007 || Kitt Peak || Spacewatch ||  || align=right data-sort-value="0.61" | 610 m || 
|-id=389 bgcolor=#fefefe
| 534389 ||  || — || August 6, 2014 || Haleakala || Pan-STARRS ||  || align=right data-sort-value="0.69" | 690 m || 
|-id=390 bgcolor=#fefefe
| 534390 Huningsheng ||  ||  || August 19, 2010 || XuYi || PMO NEO ||  || align=right data-sort-value="0.85" | 850 m || 
|-id=391 bgcolor=#FA8072
| 534391 ||  || — || March 20, 2007 || Catalina || CSS ||  || align=right | 1.7 km || 
|-id=392 bgcolor=#fefefe
| 534392 ||  || — || December 29, 2011 || Mount Lemmon || Mount Lemmon Survey ||  || align=right data-sort-value="0.67" | 670 m || 
|-id=393 bgcolor=#E9E9E9
| 534393 ||  || — || October 14, 2010 || Mount Lemmon || Mount Lemmon Survey ||  || align=right data-sort-value="0.75" | 750 m || 
|-id=394 bgcolor=#E9E9E9
| 534394 ||  || — || December 18, 2001 || Kitt Peak || Spacewatch ||  || align=right | 1.5 km || 
|-id=395 bgcolor=#fefefe
| 534395 ||  || — || December 15, 2007 || Kitt Peak || Spacewatch ||  || align=right data-sort-value="0.63" | 630 m || 
|-id=396 bgcolor=#E9E9E9
| 534396 ||  || — || October 14, 2001 || Kitt Peak || Spacewatch ||  || align=right | 1.2 km || 
|-id=397 bgcolor=#fefefe
| 534397 ||  || — || November 11, 2007 || Mount Lemmon || Mount Lemmon Survey ||  || align=right data-sort-value="0.65" | 650 m || 
|-id=398 bgcolor=#fefefe
| 534398 ||  || — || October 10, 2010 || Mount Lemmon || Mount Lemmon Survey ||  || align=right data-sort-value="0.69" | 690 m || 
|-id=399 bgcolor=#fefefe
| 534399 ||  || — || January 11, 2008 || Kitt Peak || Spacewatch ||  || align=right data-sort-value="0.54" | 540 m || 
|-id=400 bgcolor=#fefefe
| 534400 ||  || — || January 15, 2010 || WISE || WISE ||  || align=right | 1.7 km || 
|}

534401–534500 

|-bgcolor=#fefefe
| 534401 ||  || — || March 16, 2012 || Haleakala || Pan-STARRS ||  || align=right data-sort-value="0.74" | 740 m || 
|-id=402 bgcolor=#E9E9E9
| 534402 ||  || — || September 2, 2014 || Haleakala || Pan-STARRS ||  || align=right data-sort-value="0.82" | 820 m || 
|-id=403 bgcolor=#fefefe
| 534403 ||  || — || September 18, 2006 || Catalina || CSS ||  || align=right data-sort-value="0.54" | 540 m || 
|-id=404 bgcolor=#E9E9E9
| 534404 ||  || — || May 15, 2013 || Haleakala || Pan-STARRS ||  || align=right data-sort-value="0.98" | 980 m || 
|-id=405 bgcolor=#C2E0FF
| 534405 ||  || — || October 14, 2010 || Haleakala || Pan-STARRS || cubewano (cold) || align=right | 266 km || 
|-id=406 bgcolor=#E9E9E9
| 534406 ||  || — || October 1, 2014 || Kitt Peak || Spacewatch ||  || align=right | 2.1 km || 
|-id=407 bgcolor=#E9E9E9
| 534407 ||  || — || February 10, 2008 || Kitt Peak || Spacewatch ||  || align=right | 1.5 km || 
|-id=408 bgcolor=#E9E9E9
| 534408 ||  || — || August 10, 2010 || Kitt Peak || Spacewatch ||  || align=right | 1.5 km || 
|-id=409 bgcolor=#E9E9E9
| 534409 ||  || — || October 30, 2010 || Mount Lemmon || Mount Lemmon Survey ||  || align=right | 1.4 km || 
|-id=410 bgcolor=#E9E9E9
| 534410 ||  || — || November 16, 2006 || Mount Lemmon || Mount Lemmon Survey ||  || align=right | 1.1 km || 
|-id=411 bgcolor=#fefefe
| 534411 ||  || — || October 2, 2014 || Haleakala || Pan-STARRS ||  || align=right data-sort-value="0.71" | 710 m || 
|-id=412 bgcolor=#fefefe
| 534412 ||  || — || October 20, 2007 || Kitt Peak || Spacewatch ||  || align=right data-sort-value="0.74" | 740 m || 
|-id=413 bgcolor=#E9E9E9
| 534413 ||  || — || August 5, 2010 || WISE || WISE ||  || align=right | 1.5 km || 
|-id=414 bgcolor=#fefefe
| 534414 ||  || — || September 16, 2010 || Mount Lemmon || Mount Lemmon Survey ||  || align=right data-sort-value="0.85" | 850 m || 
|-id=415 bgcolor=#E9E9E9
| 534415 ||  || — || October 30, 2010 || Mount Lemmon || Mount Lemmon Survey ||  || align=right data-sort-value="0.94" | 940 m || 
|-id=416 bgcolor=#E9E9E9
| 534416 ||  || — || October 2, 2014 || Haleakala || Pan-STARRS ||  || align=right data-sort-value="0.95" | 950 m || 
|-id=417 bgcolor=#fefefe
| 534417 ||  || — || January 18, 2009 || Mount Lemmon || Mount Lemmon Survey ||  || align=right data-sort-value="0.53" | 530 m || 
|-id=418 bgcolor=#fefefe
| 534418 ||  || — || October 3, 2014 || Mount Lemmon || Mount Lemmon Survey ||  || align=right data-sort-value="0.64" | 640 m || 
|-id=419 bgcolor=#E9E9E9
| 534419 ||  || — || October 4, 2014 || Haleakala || Pan-STARRS ||  || align=right | 2.0 km || 
|-id=420 bgcolor=#fefefe
| 534420 ||  || — || December 22, 2003 || Kitt Peak || Spacewatch ||  || align=right data-sort-value="0.67" | 670 m || 
|-id=421 bgcolor=#fefefe
| 534421 ||  || — || September 18, 2010 || Mount Lemmon || Mount Lemmon Survey ||  || align=right data-sort-value="0.81" | 810 m || 
|-id=422 bgcolor=#E9E9E9
| 534422 ||  || — || April 15, 2013 || Haleakala || Pan-STARRS ||  || align=right | 1.3 km || 
|-id=423 bgcolor=#E9E9E9
| 534423 ||  || — || November 11, 2010 || Mount Lemmon || Mount Lemmon Survey ||  || align=right data-sort-value="0.82" | 820 m || 
|-id=424 bgcolor=#fefefe
| 534424 ||  || — || December 30, 2007 || Kitt Peak || Spacewatch ||  || align=right data-sort-value="0.66" | 660 m || 
|-id=425 bgcolor=#E9E9E9
| 534425 ||  || — || April 27, 2012 || Haleakala || Pan-STARRS ||  || align=right data-sort-value="0.98" | 980 m || 
|-id=426 bgcolor=#E9E9E9
| 534426 ||  || — || October 3, 2014 || Mount Lemmon || Mount Lemmon Survey ||  || align=right | 1.3 km || 
|-id=427 bgcolor=#E9E9E9
| 534427 ||  || — || January 20, 2012 || Haleakala || Pan-STARRS ||  || align=right | 2.8 km || 
|-id=428 bgcolor=#E9E9E9
| 534428 ||  || — || October 9, 2010 || Mount Lemmon || Mount Lemmon Survey ||  || align=right data-sort-value="0.94" | 940 m || 
|-id=429 bgcolor=#E9E9E9
| 534429 ||  || — || October 29, 2010 || Kitt Peak || Spacewatch ||  || align=right data-sort-value="0.90" | 900 m || 
|-id=430 bgcolor=#E9E9E9
| 534430 ||  || — || August 28, 2009 || Kitt Peak || Spacewatch ||  || align=right | 1.5 km || 
|-id=431 bgcolor=#fefefe
| 534431 ||  || — || October 4, 2014 || Mount Lemmon || Mount Lemmon Survey ||  || align=right | 1.3 km || 
|-id=432 bgcolor=#E9E9E9
| 534432 ||  || — || October 16, 2014 || Kitt Peak || Spacewatch ||  || align=right | 1.2 km || 
|-id=433 bgcolor=#E9E9E9
| 534433 ||  || — || February 19, 2012 || Kitt Peak || Spacewatch ||  || align=right | 1.1 km || 
|-id=434 bgcolor=#E9E9E9
| 534434 ||  || — || April 16, 2012 || Haleakala || Pan-STARRS ||  || align=right | 1.2 km || 
|-id=435 bgcolor=#E9E9E9
| 534435 ||  || — || November 14, 2010 || Mount Lemmon || Mount Lemmon Survey ||  || align=right data-sort-value="0.75" | 750 m || 
|-id=436 bgcolor=#fefefe
| 534436 ||  || — || February 28, 2012 || Haleakala || Pan-STARRS ||  || align=right data-sort-value="0.65" | 650 m || 
|-id=437 bgcolor=#E9E9E9
| 534437 ||  || — || November 6, 2010 || Kitt Peak || Spacewatch ||  || align=right data-sort-value="0.94" | 940 m || 
|-id=438 bgcolor=#E9E9E9
| 534438 ||  || — || November 1, 2005 || Mount Lemmon || Mount Lemmon Survey ||  || align=right | 2.4 km || 
|-id=439 bgcolor=#fefefe
| 534439 ||  || — || December 16, 2007 || Mount Lemmon || Mount Lemmon Survey ||  || align=right data-sort-value="0.82" | 820 m || 
|-id=440 bgcolor=#E9E9E9
| 534440 ||  || — || October 5, 2014 || Mount Lemmon || Mount Lemmon Survey ||  || align=right data-sort-value="0.97" | 970 m || 
|-id=441 bgcolor=#E9E9E9
| 534441 ||  || — || August 31, 2014 || Haleakala || Pan-STARRS ||  || align=right | 1.4 km || 
|-id=442 bgcolor=#E9E9E9
| 534442 ||  || — || December 9, 2010 || Mount Lemmon || Mount Lemmon Survey ||  || align=right | 1.4 km || 
|-id=443 bgcolor=#E9E9E9
| 534443 ||  || — || April 12, 2013 || Haleakala || Pan-STARRS ||  || align=right data-sort-value="0.90" | 900 m || 
|-id=444 bgcolor=#E9E9E9
| 534444 ||  || — || June 19, 2012 || Mount Lemmon || Mount Lemmon Survey ||  || align=right | 2.2 km || 
|-id=445 bgcolor=#E9E9E9
| 534445 ||  || — || November 27, 2010 || Mount Lemmon || Mount Lemmon Survey ||  || align=right data-sort-value="0.98" | 980 m || 
|-id=446 bgcolor=#E9E9E9
| 534446 ||  || — || October 3, 2014 || Mount Lemmon || Mount Lemmon Survey ||  || align=right | 1.5 km || 
|-id=447 bgcolor=#E9E9E9
| 534447 ||  || — || December 6, 2010 || Mount Lemmon || Mount Lemmon Survey ||  || align=right | 1.5 km || 
|-id=448 bgcolor=#E9E9E9
| 534448 ||  || — || November 6, 2010 || Kitt Peak || Spacewatch || critical || align=right data-sort-value="0.71" | 710 m || 
|-id=449 bgcolor=#E9E9E9
| 534449 ||  || — || April 12, 2013 || Haleakala || Pan-STARRS ||  || align=right | 1.5 km || 
|-id=450 bgcolor=#fefefe
| 534450 ||  || — || October 17, 2014 || Kitt Peak || Spacewatch ||  || align=right data-sort-value="0.55" | 550 m || 
|-id=451 bgcolor=#fefefe
| 534451 ||  || — || March 15, 2013 || Mount Lemmon || Mount Lemmon Survey ||  || align=right data-sort-value="0.65" | 650 m || 
|-id=452 bgcolor=#E9E9E9
| 534452 ||  || — || November 1, 2010 || Kitt Peak || Spacewatch ||  || align=right data-sort-value="0.90" | 900 m || 
|-id=453 bgcolor=#fefefe
| 534453 ||  || — || October 1, 1999 || Kitt Peak || Spacewatch ||  || align=right data-sort-value="0.72" | 720 m || 
|-id=454 bgcolor=#fefefe
| 534454 ||  || — || October 20, 2003 || Kitt Peak || Spacewatch ||  || align=right data-sort-value="0.67" | 670 m || 
|-id=455 bgcolor=#E9E9E9
| 534455 ||  || — || November 22, 2006 || Kitt Peak || Spacewatch ||  || align=right data-sort-value="0.71" | 710 m || 
|-id=456 bgcolor=#fefefe
| 534456 ||  || — || October 20, 2007 || Mount Lemmon || Mount Lemmon Survey ||  || align=right data-sort-value="0.68" | 680 m || 
|-id=457 bgcolor=#E9E9E9
| 534457 ||  || — || October 18, 2014 || Kitt Peak || Spacewatch ||  || align=right | 1.4 km || 
|-id=458 bgcolor=#E9E9E9
| 534458 ||  || — || December 14, 2006 || Kitt Peak || Spacewatch ||  || align=right data-sort-value="0.75" | 750 m || 
|-id=459 bgcolor=#d6d6d6
| 534459 ||  || — || November 23, 2009 || Mount Lemmon || Mount Lemmon Survey ||  || align=right | 2.0 km || 
|-id=460 bgcolor=#E9E9E9
| 534460 ||  || — || November 6, 2010 || Mount Lemmon || Mount Lemmon Survey ||  || align=right | 1.0 km || 
|-id=461 bgcolor=#E9E9E9
| 534461 ||  || — || July 29, 2014 || Haleakala || Pan-STARRS ||  || align=right | 1.4 km || 
|-id=462 bgcolor=#fefefe
| 534462 ||  || — || December 19, 2003 || Kitt Peak || Spacewatch ||  || align=right data-sort-value="0.71" | 710 m || 
|-id=463 bgcolor=#E9E9E9
| 534463 ||  || — || July 29, 2010 || WISE || WISE ||  || align=right data-sort-value="0.62" | 620 m || 
|-id=464 bgcolor=#E9E9E9
| 534464 ||  || — || October 20, 2014 || Kitt Peak || Spacewatch ||  || align=right | 1.4 km || 
|-id=465 bgcolor=#E9E9E9
| 534465 ||  || — || October 1, 2014 || Haleakala || Pan-STARRS ||  || align=right | 1.5 km || 
|-id=466 bgcolor=#E9E9E9
| 534466 ||  || — || September 4, 2014 || Haleakala || Pan-STARRS ||  || align=right data-sort-value="0.91" | 910 m || 
|-id=467 bgcolor=#E9E9E9
| 534467 ||  || — || April 14, 2007 || Kitt Peak || Spacewatch ||  || align=right | 2.3 km || 
|-id=468 bgcolor=#E9E9E9
| 534468 ||  || — || November 11, 2010 || Kitt Peak || Spacewatch ||  || align=right | 1.2 km || 
|-id=469 bgcolor=#E9E9E9
| 534469 ||  || — || July 15, 2013 || Haleakala || Pan-STARRS ||  || align=right | 2.2 km || 
|-id=470 bgcolor=#E9E9E9
| 534470 ||  || — || October 27, 2005 || Kitt Peak || Spacewatch ||  || align=right | 1.6 km || 
|-id=471 bgcolor=#E9E9E9
| 534471 ||  || — || October 20, 2014 || Kitt Peak || Spacewatch ||  || align=right | 1.8 km || 
|-id=472 bgcolor=#E9E9E9
| 534472 ||  || — || October 3, 2014 || Mount Lemmon || Mount Lemmon Survey ||  || align=right | 1.7 km || 
|-id=473 bgcolor=#fefefe
| 534473 ||  || — || April 14, 2008 || Mount Lemmon || Mount Lemmon Survey ||  || align=right data-sort-value="0.73" | 730 m || 
|-id=474 bgcolor=#fefefe
| 534474 ||  || — || September 4, 2014 || Haleakala || Pan-STARRS ||  || align=right data-sort-value="0.63" | 630 m || 
|-id=475 bgcolor=#E9E9E9
| 534475 ||  || — || November 3, 2010 || Kitt Peak || Spacewatch ||  || align=right data-sort-value="0.96" | 960 m || 
|-id=476 bgcolor=#fefefe
| 534476 ||  || — || December 30, 2000 || Socorro || LINEAR ||  || align=right | 1.4 km || 
|-id=477 bgcolor=#fefefe
| 534477 ||  || — || October 24, 2011 || Mount Lemmon || Mount Lemmon Survey ||  || align=right data-sort-value="0.53" | 530 m || 
|-id=478 bgcolor=#E9E9E9
| 534478 ||  || — || September 4, 2010 || Kitt Peak || Spacewatch ||  || align=right data-sort-value="0.95" | 950 m || 
|-id=479 bgcolor=#fefefe
| 534479 ||  || — || September 19, 2003 || Kitt Peak || Spacewatch ||  || align=right data-sort-value="0.56" | 560 m || 
|-id=480 bgcolor=#d6d6d6
| 534480 ||  || — || November 20, 2009 || Mount Lemmon || Mount Lemmon Survey ||  || align=right | 2.3 km || 
|-id=481 bgcolor=#fefefe
| 534481 ||  || — || January 26, 2012 || Haleakala || Pan-STARRS ||  || align=right data-sort-value="0.84" | 840 m || 
|-id=482 bgcolor=#fefefe
| 534482 ||  || — || September 10, 2010 || La Sagra || OAM Obs. ||  || align=right data-sort-value="0.86" | 860 m || 
|-id=483 bgcolor=#fefefe
| 534483 ||  || — || August 16, 2006 || Siding Spring || SSS ||  || align=right data-sort-value="0.86" | 860 m || 
|-id=484 bgcolor=#E9E9E9
| 534484 ||  || — || October 15, 2001 || Kitt Peak || Spacewatch ||  || align=right | 1.4 km || 
|-id=485 bgcolor=#E9E9E9
| 534485 ||  || — || October 23, 2001 || Kitt Peak || Spacewatch ||  || align=right | 1.3 km || 
|-id=486 bgcolor=#E9E9E9
| 534486 ||  || — || November 18, 2006 || Kitt Peak || Spacewatch ||  || align=right data-sort-value="0.62" | 620 m || 
|-id=487 bgcolor=#E9E9E9
| 534487 ||  || — || November 8, 2010 || Kitt Peak || Spacewatch ||  || align=right | 1.3 km || 
|-id=488 bgcolor=#E9E9E9
| 534488 ||  || — || October 21, 2014 || Kitt Peak || Spacewatch ||  || align=right | 1.3 km || 
|-id=489 bgcolor=#fefefe
| 534489 ||  || — || September 17, 2010 || Mount Lemmon || Mount Lemmon Survey ||  || align=right data-sort-value="0.60" | 600 m || 
|-id=490 bgcolor=#E9E9E9
| 534490 ||  || — || October 21, 2014 || Kitt Peak || Spacewatch ||  || align=right data-sort-value="0.98" | 980 m || 
|-id=491 bgcolor=#E9E9E9
| 534491 ||  || — || October 21, 2014 || Kitt Peak || Spacewatch ||  || align=right data-sort-value="0.99" | 990 m || 
|-id=492 bgcolor=#E9E9E9
| 534492 ||  || — || October 29, 2005 || Kitt Peak || Spacewatch ||  || align=right | 3.3 km || 
|-id=493 bgcolor=#E9E9E9
| 534493 ||  || — || October 17, 2001 || Socorro || LINEAR ||  || align=right | 1.5 km || 
|-id=494 bgcolor=#fefefe
| 534494 ||  || — || October 1, 2000 || Kitt Peak || Spacewatch ||  || align=right data-sort-value="0.66" | 660 m || 
|-id=495 bgcolor=#E9E9E9
| 534495 ||  || — || May 30, 2013 || Mount Lemmon || Mount Lemmon Survey ||  || align=right | 1.2 km || 
|-id=496 bgcolor=#fefefe
| 534496 ||  || — || September 12, 2007 || Catalina || CSS ||  || align=right data-sort-value="0.60" | 600 m || 
|-id=497 bgcolor=#E9E9E9
| 534497 ||  || — || September 30, 2005 || Mount Lemmon || Mount Lemmon Survey ||  || align=right | 2.5 km || 
|-id=498 bgcolor=#E9E9E9
| 534498 ||  || — || November 7, 2010 || Kitt Peak || Spacewatch ||  || align=right data-sort-value="0.88" | 880 m || 
|-id=499 bgcolor=#E9E9E9
| 534499 ||  || — || November 11, 2006 || Kitt Peak || Spacewatch ||  || align=right data-sort-value="0.75" | 750 m || 
|-id=500 bgcolor=#E9E9E9
| 534500 ||  || — || October 24, 2014 || Catalina || CSS ||  || align=right | 1.3 km || 
|}

534501–534600 

|-bgcolor=#fefefe
| 534501 ||  || — || October 9, 2010 || Mount Lemmon || Mount Lemmon Survey ||  || align=right data-sort-value="0.71" | 710 m || 
|-id=502 bgcolor=#fefefe
| 534502 ||  || — || October 18, 2014 || Mount Lemmon || Mount Lemmon Survey ||  || align=right | 1.1 km || 
|-id=503 bgcolor=#E9E9E9
| 534503 ||  || — || August 29, 2005 || Kitt Peak || Spacewatch ||  || align=right | 1.3 km || 
|-id=504 bgcolor=#fefefe
| 534504 ||  || — || September 19, 2003 || Kitt Peak || Spacewatch ||  || align=right data-sort-value="0.63" | 630 m || 
|-id=505 bgcolor=#E9E9E9
| 534505 ||  || — || March 16, 2012 || Kitt Peak || Spacewatch ||  || align=right | 1.1 km || 
|-id=506 bgcolor=#E9E9E9
| 534506 ||  || — || October 10, 2005 || Catalina || CSS ||  || align=right | 2.1 km || 
|-id=507 bgcolor=#fefefe
| 534507 ||  || — || November 19, 2003 || Kitt Peak || Spacewatch ||  || align=right data-sort-value="0.94" | 940 m || 
|-id=508 bgcolor=#fefefe
| 534508 ||  || — || September 11, 2010 || Kitt Peak || Spacewatch ||  || align=right data-sort-value="0.62" | 620 m || 
|-id=509 bgcolor=#fefefe
| 534509 ||  || — || September 18, 2003 || Kitt Peak || Spacewatch ||  || align=right data-sort-value="0.53" | 530 m || 
|-id=510 bgcolor=#fefefe
| 534510 ||  || — || September 29, 2003 || Kitt Peak || Spacewatch ||  || align=right data-sort-value="0.53" | 530 m || 
|-id=511 bgcolor=#E9E9E9
| 534511 ||  || — || December 27, 2006 || Mount Lemmon || Mount Lemmon Survey ||  || align=right data-sort-value="0.78" | 780 m || 
|-id=512 bgcolor=#fefefe
| 534512 ||  || — || September 28, 2003 || Kitt Peak || Spacewatch ||  || align=right data-sort-value="0.69" | 690 m || 
|-id=513 bgcolor=#fefefe
| 534513 ||  || — || September 6, 2010 || Mount Lemmon || Mount Lemmon Survey ||  || align=right data-sort-value="0.55" | 550 m || 
|-id=514 bgcolor=#fefefe
| 534514 ||  || — || April 22, 2009 || Mount Lemmon || Mount Lemmon Survey ||  || align=right data-sort-value="0.82" | 820 m || 
|-id=515 bgcolor=#E9E9E9
| 534515 ||  || — || September 24, 2014 || Mount Lemmon || Mount Lemmon Survey ||  || align=right | 1.3 km || 
|-id=516 bgcolor=#E9E9E9
| 534516 ||  || — || May 8, 2013 || Haleakala || Pan-STARRS ||  || align=right data-sort-value="0.90" | 900 m || 
|-id=517 bgcolor=#E9E9E9
| 534517 ||  || — || September 11, 2010 || Mount Lemmon || Mount Lemmon Survey ||  || align=right data-sort-value="0.86" | 860 m || 
|-id=518 bgcolor=#fefefe
| 534518 ||  || — || October 10, 2010 || Mount Lemmon || Mount Lemmon Survey ||  || align=right data-sort-value="0.81" | 810 m || 
|-id=519 bgcolor=#E9E9E9
| 534519 ||  || — || December 21, 2006 || Mount Lemmon || Mount Lemmon Survey ||  || align=right | 1.1 km || 
|-id=520 bgcolor=#E9E9E9
| 534520 ||  || — || September 2, 2014 || Mount Lemmon || Mount Lemmon Survey ||  || align=right | 1.1 km || 
|-id=521 bgcolor=#E9E9E9
| 534521 ||  || — || October 22, 2014 || Mount Lemmon || Mount Lemmon Survey ||  || align=right | 1.1 km || 
|-id=522 bgcolor=#d6d6d6
| 534522 ||  || — || September 30, 2006 || Mount Lemmon || Mount Lemmon Survey || 3:2 || align=right | 4.2 km || 
|-id=523 bgcolor=#fefefe
| 534523 ||  || — || May 13, 2009 || Kitt Peak || Spacewatch ||  || align=right data-sort-value="0.89" | 890 m || 
|-id=524 bgcolor=#E9E9E9
| 534524 ||  || — || October 23, 2014 || Kitt Peak || Spacewatch ||  || align=right data-sort-value="0.86" | 860 m || 
|-id=525 bgcolor=#fefefe
| 534525 ||  || — || January 2, 2012 || Kitt Peak || Spacewatch ||  || align=right data-sort-value="0.56" | 560 m || 
|-id=526 bgcolor=#fefefe
| 534526 ||  || — || August 31, 2014 || Haleakala || Pan-STARRS ||  || align=right data-sort-value="0.63" | 630 m || 
|-id=527 bgcolor=#E9E9E9
| 534527 ||  || — || December 2, 2010 || Mount Lemmon || Mount Lemmon Survey ||  || align=right data-sort-value="0.83" | 830 m || 
|-id=528 bgcolor=#E9E9E9
| 534528 ||  || — || February 27, 2008 || Kitt Peak || Spacewatch ||  || align=right data-sort-value="0.94" | 940 m || 
|-id=529 bgcolor=#E9E9E9
| 534529 ||  || — || October 1, 2005 || Mount Lemmon || Mount Lemmon Survey ||  || align=right | 1.5 km || 
|-id=530 bgcolor=#E9E9E9
| 534530 ||  || — || November 6, 2010 || Mount Lemmon || Mount Lemmon Survey ||  || align=right data-sort-value="0.89" | 890 m || 
|-id=531 bgcolor=#E9E9E9
| 534531 ||  || — || November 3, 2010 || Mount Lemmon || Mount Lemmon Survey ||  || align=right data-sort-value="0.57" | 570 m || 
|-id=532 bgcolor=#E9E9E9
| 534532 ||  || — || October 3, 2006 || Mount Lemmon || Mount Lemmon Survey ||  || align=right | 1.4 km || 
|-id=533 bgcolor=#fefefe
| 534533 ||  || — || September 22, 2003 || Kitt Peak || Spacewatch ||  || align=right data-sort-value="0.87" | 870 m || 
|-id=534 bgcolor=#E9E9E9
| 534534 ||  || — || November 2, 2010 || Mount Lemmon || Mount Lemmon Survey ||  || align=right | 1.3 km || 
|-id=535 bgcolor=#fefefe
| 534535 ||  || — || September 10, 2007 || Kitt Peak || Spacewatch ||  || align=right data-sort-value="0.56" | 560 m || 
|-id=536 bgcolor=#fefefe
| 534536 ||  || — || December 30, 2007 || Kitt Peak || Spacewatch || MAS || align=right data-sort-value="0.58" | 580 m || 
|-id=537 bgcolor=#E9E9E9
| 534537 ||  || — || October 24, 2014 || Kitt Peak || Spacewatch ||  || align=right | 1.2 km || 
|-id=538 bgcolor=#E9E9E9
| 534538 ||  || — || September 2, 2014 || Mount Lemmon || Mount Lemmon Survey ||  || align=right | 1.4 km || 
|-id=539 bgcolor=#E9E9E9
| 534539 ||  || — || September 1, 2014 || Mount Lemmon || Mount Lemmon Survey ||  || align=right data-sort-value="0.80" | 800 m || 
|-id=540 bgcolor=#E9E9E9
| 534540 ||  || — || October 30, 2010 || Kitt Peak || Spacewatch ||  || align=right data-sort-value="0.82" | 820 m || 
|-id=541 bgcolor=#fefefe
| 534541 ||  || — || August 30, 2014 || Haleakala || Pan-STARRS ||  || align=right data-sort-value="0.80" | 800 m || 
|-id=542 bgcolor=#fefefe
| 534542 ||  || — || February 26, 2009 || Mount Lemmon || Mount Lemmon Survey ||  || align=right data-sort-value="0.80" | 800 m || 
|-id=543 bgcolor=#fefefe
| 534543 ||  || — || June 7, 2013 || Haleakala || Pan-STARRS ||  || align=right data-sort-value="0.77" | 770 m || 
|-id=544 bgcolor=#E9E9E9
| 534544 ||  || — || November 30, 2010 || Mount Lemmon || Mount Lemmon Survey || (5) || align=right data-sort-value="0.67" | 670 m || 
|-id=545 bgcolor=#E9E9E9
| 534545 ||  || — || September 4, 2014 || Haleakala || Pan-STARRS ||  || align=right | 1.0 km || 
|-id=546 bgcolor=#fefefe
| 534546 ||  || — || March 26, 2010 || WISE || WISE ||  || align=right data-sort-value="0.78" | 780 m || 
|-id=547 bgcolor=#E9E9E9
| 534547 ||  || — || January 4, 2011 || Catalina || CSS ||  || align=right | 1.4 km || 
|-id=548 bgcolor=#E9E9E9
| 534548 ||  || — || October 7, 2014 || Haleakala || Pan-STARRS || MAR || align=right | 1.2 km || 
|-id=549 bgcolor=#E9E9E9
| 534549 ||  || — || October 2, 1997 || Kitt Peak || Spacewatch ||  || align=right | 1.3 km || 
|-id=550 bgcolor=#E9E9E9
| 534550 ||  || — || October 3, 2014 || Mount Lemmon || Mount Lemmon Survey || (5) || align=right data-sort-value="0.78" | 780 m || 
|-id=551 bgcolor=#E9E9E9
| 534551 ||  || — || October 7, 2010 || Mount Lemmon || Mount Lemmon Survey || KON || align=right | 2.5 km || 
|-id=552 bgcolor=#E9E9E9
| 534552 ||  || — || November 4, 2005 || Mount Lemmon || Mount Lemmon Survey ||  || align=right | 2.2 km || 
|-id=553 bgcolor=#E9E9E9
| 534553 ||  || — || December 2, 2010 || Catalina || CSS || MAR || align=right | 1.0 km || 
|-id=554 bgcolor=#E9E9E9
| 534554 ||  || — || November 17, 2001 || Kitt Peak || Spacewatch ||  || align=right | 1.3 km || 
|-id=555 bgcolor=#E9E9E9
| 534555 ||  || — || October 30, 2010 || Kitt Peak || Spacewatch ||  || align=right data-sort-value="0.94" | 940 m || 
|-id=556 bgcolor=#fefefe
| 534556 ||  || — || January 16, 2005 || Kitt Peak || Spacewatch ||  || align=right data-sort-value="0.48" | 480 m || 
|-id=557 bgcolor=#E9E9E9
| 534557 ||  || — || November 27, 2010 || Mount Lemmon || Mount Lemmon Survey ||  || align=right data-sort-value="0.98" | 980 m || 
|-id=558 bgcolor=#E9E9E9
| 534558 ||  || — || October 13, 2010 || Mount Lemmon || Mount Lemmon Survey ||  || align=right | 1.1 km || 
|-id=559 bgcolor=#E9E9E9
| 534559 ||  || — || November 2, 2010 || Kitt Peak || Spacewatch ||  || align=right data-sort-value="0.81" | 810 m || 
|-id=560 bgcolor=#fefefe
| 534560 ||  || — || November 16, 2003 || Kitt Peak || Spacewatch || V || align=right data-sort-value="0.72" | 720 m || 
|-id=561 bgcolor=#fefefe
| 534561 ||  || — || June 9, 2010 || WISE || WISE ||  || align=right data-sort-value="0.75" | 750 m || 
|-id=562 bgcolor=#E9E9E9
| 534562 ||  || — || December 13, 2010 || Mount Lemmon || Mount Lemmon Survey ||  || align=right data-sort-value="0.71" | 710 m || 
|-id=563 bgcolor=#E9E9E9
| 534563 ||  || — || November 10, 2010 || Mount Lemmon || Mount Lemmon Survey ||  || align=right | 1.2 km || 
|-id=564 bgcolor=#E9E9E9
| 534564 ||  || — || August 25, 2014 || Haleakala || Pan-STARRS ||  || align=right data-sort-value="0.71" | 710 m || 
|-id=565 bgcolor=#E9E9E9
| 534565 ||  || — || December 11, 2010 || Kitt Peak || Spacewatch ||  || align=right | 1.2 km || 
|-id=566 bgcolor=#fefefe
| 534566 ||  || — || September 17, 2003 || Kitt Peak || Spacewatch ||  || align=right data-sort-value="0.58" | 580 m || 
|-id=567 bgcolor=#fefefe
| 534567 ||  || — || May 3, 2013 || Haleakala || Pan-STARRS ||  || align=right data-sort-value="0.77" | 770 m || 
|-id=568 bgcolor=#E9E9E9
| 534568 ||  || — || May 8, 2013 || Haleakala || Pan-STARRS ||  || align=right | 1.3 km || 
|-id=569 bgcolor=#fefefe
| 534569 ||  || — || September 16, 2003 || Kitt Peak || Spacewatch ||  || align=right data-sort-value="0.61" | 610 m || 
|-id=570 bgcolor=#fefefe
| 534570 ||  || — || October 7, 2007 || Mount Lemmon || Mount Lemmon Survey ||  || align=right data-sort-value="0.67" | 670 m || 
|-id=571 bgcolor=#E9E9E9
| 534571 ||  || — || February 23, 2007 || Catalina || CSS ||  || align=right | 1.7 km || 
|-id=572 bgcolor=#E9E9E9
| 534572 ||  || — || August 18, 2009 || Kitt Peak || Spacewatch ||  || align=right | 2.0 km || 
|-id=573 bgcolor=#fefefe
| 534573 ||  || — || October 9, 2007 || Mount Lemmon || Mount Lemmon Survey ||  || align=right data-sort-value="0.66" | 660 m || 
|-id=574 bgcolor=#fefefe
| 534574 ||  || — || October 22, 2003 || Kitt Peak || Spacewatch || MAS || align=right data-sort-value="0.63" | 630 m || 
|-id=575 bgcolor=#E9E9E9
| 534575 ||  || — || May 8, 2013 || Haleakala || Pan-STARRS ||  || align=right data-sort-value="0.98" | 980 m || 
|-id=576 bgcolor=#E9E9E9
| 534576 ||  || — || November 12, 2010 || Kitt Peak || Spacewatch ||  || align=right data-sort-value="0.82" | 820 m || 
|-id=577 bgcolor=#E9E9E9
| 534577 ||  || — || October 30, 2010 || Mount Lemmon || Mount Lemmon Survey ||  || align=right data-sort-value="0.89" | 890 m || 
|-id=578 bgcolor=#fefefe
| 534578 ||  || — || September 4, 2010 || Kitt Peak || Spacewatch || V || align=right data-sort-value="0.48" | 480 m || 
|-id=579 bgcolor=#E9E9E9
| 534579 ||  || — || October 26, 2014 || Haleakala || Pan-STARRS ||  || align=right data-sort-value="0.79" | 790 m || 
|-id=580 bgcolor=#fefefe
| 534580 ||  || — || August 28, 2014 || Haleakala || Pan-STARRS ||  || align=right data-sort-value="0.84" | 840 m || 
|-id=581 bgcolor=#E9E9E9
| 534581 ||  || — || June 2, 2013 || Mount Lemmon || Mount Lemmon Survey ||  || align=right data-sort-value="0.89" | 890 m || 
|-id=582 bgcolor=#E9E9E9
| 534582 ||  || — || December 3, 2010 || Mount Lemmon || Mount Lemmon Survey || EUN || align=right | 1.1 km || 
|-id=583 bgcolor=#E9E9E9
| 534583 ||  || — || December 6, 2010 || Catalina || CSS || BRG || align=right | 1.4 km || 
|-id=584 bgcolor=#fefefe
| 534584 ||  || — || November 16, 1999 || Kitt Peak || Spacewatch ||  || align=right data-sort-value="0.90" | 900 m || 
|-id=585 bgcolor=#fefefe
| 534585 ||  || — || October 2, 2003 || Kitt Peak || Spacewatch ||  || align=right data-sort-value="0.72" | 720 m || 
|-id=586 bgcolor=#E9E9E9
| 534586 ||  || — || September 3, 2010 || Mount Lemmon || Mount Lemmon Survey || MAR || align=right data-sort-value="0.98" | 980 m || 
|-id=587 bgcolor=#E9E9E9
| 534587 ||  || — || November 5, 2010 || Kitt Peak || Spacewatch ||  || align=right data-sort-value="0.90" | 900 m || 
|-id=588 bgcolor=#E9E9E9
| 534588 ||  || — || November 4, 2010 || La Sagra || OAM Obs. || MAR || align=right | 1.00 km || 
|-id=589 bgcolor=#fefefe
| 534589 ||  || — || October 9, 2007 || Kitt Peak || Spacewatch ||  || align=right data-sort-value="0.51" | 510 m || 
|-id=590 bgcolor=#fefefe
| 534590 ||  || — || November 26, 2003 || Kitt Peak || Spacewatch || NYS || align=right data-sort-value="0.44" | 440 m || 
|-id=591 bgcolor=#E9E9E9
| 534591 ||  || — || November 1, 2010 || Mount Lemmon || Mount Lemmon Survey || EUN || align=right | 1.8 km || 
|-id=592 bgcolor=#fefefe
| 534592 ||  || — || October 28, 2014 || Haleakala || Pan-STARRS ||  || align=right data-sort-value="0.67" | 670 m || 
|-id=593 bgcolor=#E9E9E9
| 534593 ||  || — || March 16, 2012 || Catalina || CSS ||  || align=right | 2.2 km || 
|-id=594 bgcolor=#E9E9E9
| 534594 ||  || — || November 15, 2010 || Mount Lemmon || Mount Lemmon Survey ||  || align=right | 1.2 km || 
|-id=595 bgcolor=#E9E9E9
| 534595 ||  || — || October 28, 2014 || Mount Lemmon || Mount Lemmon Survey ||  || align=right | 1.4 km || 
|-id=596 bgcolor=#fefefe
| 534596 ||  || — || October 3, 2014 || Mount Lemmon || Mount Lemmon Survey ||  || align=right data-sort-value="0.83" | 830 m || 
|-id=597 bgcolor=#E9E9E9
| 534597 ||  || — || August 29, 2005 || Kitt Peak || Spacewatch || MAR || align=right | 1.5 km || 
|-id=598 bgcolor=#E9E9E9
| 534598 ||  || — || November 17, 2006 || Kitt Peak || Spacewatch || (5) || align=right data-sort-value="0.59" | 590 m || 
|-id=599 bgcolor=#fefefe
| 534599 ||  || — || December 18, 2007 || Kitt Peak || Spacewatch ||  || align=right data-sort-value="0.52" | 520 m || 
|-id=600 bgcolor=#E9E9E9
| 534600 ||  || — || November 16, 2006 || Kitt Peak || Spacewatch ||  || align=right data-sort-value="0.59" | 590 m || 
|}

534601–534700 

|-bgcolor=#E9E9E9
| 534601 ||  || — || November 2, 2010 || Kitt Peak || Spacewatch ||  || align=right | 1.7 km || 
|-id=602 bgcolor=#fefefe
| 534602 ||  || — || November 4, 2010 || Mount Lemmon || Mount Lemmon Survey || V || align=right data-sort-value="0.62" | 620 m || 
|-id=603 bgcolor=#fefefe
| 534603 ||  || — || February 16, 2012 || Haleakala || Pan-STARRS ||  || align=right data-sort-value="0.70" | 700 m || 
|-id=604 bgcolor=#E9E9E9
| 534604 ||  || — || April 3, 2008 || Mount Lemmon || Mount Lemmon Survey ||  || align=right | 1.4 km || 
|-id=605 bgcolor=#E9E9E9
| 534605 ||  || — || December 14, 2010 || Mount Lemmon || Mount Lemmon Survey ||  || align=right data-sort-value="0.94" | 940 m || 
|-id=606 bgcolor=#E9E9E9
| 534606 ||  || — || October 29, 2014 || Catalina || CSS ||  || align=right | 2.7 km || 
|-id=607 bgcolor=#FA8072
| 534607 ||  || — || June 27, 2014 || Haleakala || Pan-STARRS ||  || align=right | 1.4 km || 
|-id=608 bgcolor=#E9E9E9
| 534608 ||  || — || October 29, 2014 || Catalina || CSS ||  || align=right | 1.5 km || 
|-id=609 bgcolor=#E9E9E9
| 534609 ||  || — || December 5, 2005 || Kitt Peak || Spacewatch ||  || align=right | 3.7 km || 
|-id=610 bgcolor=#fefefe
| 534610 ||  || — || October 22, 2014 || Kitt Peak || Spacewatch ||  || align=right data-sort-value="0.46" | 460 m || 
|-id=611 bgcolor=#fefefe
| 534611 ||  || — || October 30, 2014 || Kitt Peak || Spacewatch ||  || align=right data-sort-value="0.69" | 690 m || 
|-id=612 bgcolor=#E9E9E9
| 534612 ||  || — || November 25, 2006 || Mount Lemmon || Mount Lemmon Survey ||  || align=right | 1.5 km || 
|-id=613 bgcolor=#E9E9E9
| 534613 ||  || — || September 23, 2006 || Kitt Peak || Spacewatch ||  || align=right data-sort-value="0.68" | 680 m || 
|-id=614 bgcolor=#E9E9E9
| 534614 ||  || — || November 12, 2010 || Kitt Peak || Spacewatch ||  || align=right data-sort-value="0.90" | 900 m || 
|-id=615 bgcolor=#E9E9E9
| 534615 ||  || — || October 21, 2014 || Kitt Peak || Spacewatch ||  || align=right | 1.6 km || 
|-id=616 bgcolor=#fefefe
| 534616 ||  || — || October 18, 2014 || Mount Lemmon || Mount Lemmon Survey ||  || align=right data-sort-value="0.65" | 650 m || 
|-id=617 bgcolor=#E9E9E9
| 534617 ||  || — || February 9, 2007 || Mount Lemmon || Mount Lemmon Survey || (5) || align=right data-sort-value="0.64" | 640 m || 
|-id=618 bgcolor=#E9E9E9
| 534618 ||  || — || November 3, 2010 || Mount Lemmon || Mount Lemmon Survey ||  || align=right | 1.8 km || 
|-id=619 bgcolor=#d6d6d6
| 534619 ||  || — || October 22, 2003 || Kitt Peak || Spacewatch ||  || align=right | 4.0 km || 
|-id=620 bgcolor=#E9E9E9
| 534620 ||  || — || May 12, 2013 || Kitt Peak || Spacewatch || EUN || align=right | 1.0 km || 
|-id=621 bgcolor=#E9E9E9
| 534621 ||  || — || October 21, 2014 || Catalina || CSS ||  || align=right | 1.1 km || 
|-id=622 bgcolor=#E9E9E9
| 534622 ||  || — || August 29, 2014 || Haleakala || Pan-STARRS || EUN || align=right | 1.3 km || 
|-id=623 bgcolor=#E9E9E9
| 534623 ||  || — || November 1, 2010 || Mount Lemmon || Mount Lemmon Survey ||  || align=right | 1.3 km || 
|-id=624 bgcolor=#fefefe
| 534624 ||  || — || December 26, 2011 || Kitt Peak || Spacewatch ||  || align=right data-sort-value="0.83" | 830 m || 
|-id=625 bgcolor=#C2E0FF
| 534625 ||  || — || November 16, 2010 || Haleakala || Pan-STARRS || cubewano (cold)critical || align=right | 344 km || 
|-id=626 bgcolor=#C2E0FF
| 534626 ||  || — || October 9, 2010 || Haleakala || Pan-STARRS || twotino || align=right | 206 km || 
|-id=627 bgcolor=#C2E0FF
| 534627 ||  || — || October 7, 2010 || Haleakala || Pan-STARRS || res3:11 || align=right | 254 km || 
|-id=628 bgcolor=#fefefe
| 534628 ||  || — || December 20, 2007 || Kitt Peak || Spacewatch ||  || align=right data-sort-value="0.69" | 690 m || 
|-id=629 bgcolor=#E9E9E9
| 534629 ||  || — || December 4, 2005 || Catalina || CSS ||  || align=right | 2.7 km || 
|-id=630 bgcolor=#d6d6d6
| 534630 ||  || — || December 2, 1999 || Kitt Peak || Spacewatch ||  || align=right | 2.2 km || 
|-id=631 bgcolor=#C2E0FF
| 534631 ||  || — || September 13, 2010 || Haleakala || Pan-STARRS || other TNO || align=right | 97 km || 
|-id=632 bgcolor=#E9E9E9
| 534632 ||  || — || November 6, 2010 || Mount Lemmon || Mount Lemmon Survey ||  || align=right data-sort-value="0.68" | 680 m || 
|-id=633 bgcolor=#E9E9E9
| 534633 ||  || — || October 28, 2014 || Haleakala || Pan-STARRS ||  || align=right | 1.1 km || 
|-id=634 bgcolor=#fefefe
| 534634 ||  || — || October 13, 2007 || Mount Lemmon || Mount Lemmon Survey ||  || align=right data-sort-value="0.71" | 710 m || 
|-id=635 bgcolor=#E9E9E9
| 534635 ||  || — || November 12, 2001 || Socorro || LINEAR ||  || align=right | 2.9 km || 
|-id=636 bgcolor=#fefefe
| 534636 ||  || — || October 17, 2010 || Mount Lemmon || Mount Lemmon Survey ||  || align=right data-sort-value="0.70" | 700 m || 
|-id=637 bgcolor=#E9E9E9
| 534637 ||  || — || February 10, 2008 || Mount Lemmon || Mount Lemmon Survey ||  || align=right | 2.0 km || 
|-id=638 bgcolor=#E9E9E9
| 534638 ||  || — || December 1, 2006 || Mount Lemmon || Mount Lemmon Survey ||  || align=right data-sort-value="0.86" | 860 m || 
|-id=639 bgcolor=#E9E9E9
| 534639 ||  || — || January 10, 2007 || Mount Lemmon || Mount Lemmon Survey ||  || align=right | 1.1 km || 
|-id=640 bgcolor=#E9E9E9
| 534640 ||  || — || April 5, 2008 || Mount Lemmon || Mount Lemmon Survey ||  || align=right | 1.7 km || 
|-id=641 bgcolor=#E9E9E9
| 534641 ||  || — || October 14, 2001 || Cima Ekar || ADAS ||  || align=right | 1.3 km || 
|-id=642 bgcolor=#fefefe
| 534642 ||  || — || September 15, 2010 || Mount Lemmon || Mount Lemmon Survey ||  || align=right data-sort-value="0.71" | 710 m || 
|-id=643 bgcolor=#fefefe
| 534643 ||  || — || October 24, 2014 || Mount Lemmon || Mount Lemmon Survey ||  || align=right data-sort-value="0.58" | 580 m || 
|-id=644 bgcolor=#fefefe
| 534644 ||  || — || February 3, 2012 || Haleakala || Pan-STARRS ||  || align=right data-sort-value="0.79" | 790 m || 
|-id=645 bgcolor=#E9E9E9
| 534645 ||  || — || October 16, 2014 || Mount Lemmon || Mount Lemmon Survey ||  || align=right | 1.0 km || 
|-id=646 bgcolor=#E9E9E9
| 534646 ||  || — || February 28, 2008 || Mount Lemmon || Mount Lemmon Survey ||  || align=right data-sort-value="0.71" | 710 m || 
|-id=647 bgcolor=#fefefe
| 534647 ||  || — || October 21, 2014 || Kitt Peak || Spacewatch ||  || align=right data-sort-value="0.61" | 610 m || 
|-id=648 bgcolor=#E9E9E9
| 534648 ||  || — || July 27, 2009 || Kitt Peak || Spacewatch ||  || align=right data-sort-value="0.84" | 840 m || 
|-id=649 bgcolor=#fefefe
| 534649 ||  || — || October 22, 2014 || Kitt Peak || Spacewatch ||  || align=right data-sort-value="0.79" | 790 m || 
|-id=650 bgcolor=#E9E9E9
| 534650 ||  || — || May 14, 2004 || Kitt Peak || Spacewatch ||  || align=right data-sort-value="0.91" | 910 m || 
|-id=651 bgcolor=#E9E9E9
| 534651 ||  || — || October 22, 2014 || Mount Lemmon || Mount Lemmon Survey ||  || align=right | 1.5 km || 
|-id=652 bgcolor=#E9E9E9
| 534652 ||  || — || August 30, 2005 || Kitt Peak || Spacewatch ||  || align=right | 1.3 km || 
|-id=653 bgcolor=#E9E9E9
| 534653 ||  || — || December 5, 2010 || Mount Lemmon || Mount Lemmon Survey ||  || align=right data-sort-value="0.72" | 720 m || 
|-id=654 bgcolor=#E9E9E9
| 534654 ||  || — || October 26, 2014 || Mount Lemmon || Mount Lemmon Survey ||  || align=right | 1.6 km || 
|-id=655 bgcolor=#E9E9E9
| 534655 ||  || — || October 26, 2014 || Mount Lemmon || Mount Lemmon Survey ||  || align=right | 1.4 km || 
|-id=656 bgcolor=#E9E9E9
| 534656 ||  || — || October 26, 2014 || Mount Lemmon || Mount Lemmon Survey ||  || align=right data-sort-value="0.86" | 860 m || 
|-id=657 bgcolor=#E9E9E9
| 534657 ||  || — || October 26, 2014 || Haleakala || Pan-STARRS ||  || align=right | 1.4 km || 
|-id=658 bgcolor=#fefefe
| 534658 ||  || — || January 4, 2012 || Mount Lemmon || Mount Lemmon Survey ||  || align=right data-sort-value="0.54" | 540 m || 
|-id=659 bgcolor=#E9E9E9
| 534659 ||  || — || October 22, 2006 || Kitt Peak || Spacewatch ||  || align=right data-sort-value="0.88" | 880 m || 
|-id=660 bgcolor=#fefefe
| 534660 ||  || — || January 11, 2008 || Kitt Peak || Spacewatch ||  || align=right data-sort-value="0.65" | 650 m || 
|-id=661 bgcolor=#E9E9E9
| 534661 ||  || — || October 28, 2014 || Haleakala || Pan-STARRS ||  || align=right | 1.2 km || 
|-id=662 bgcolor=#E9E9E9
| 534662 ||  || — || March 17, 2012 || Mount Lemmon || Mount Lemmon Survey ||  || align=right data-sort-value="0.94" | 940 m || 
|-id=663 bgcolor=#fefefe
| 534663 ||  || — || October 17, 2010 || Mount Lemmon || Mount Lemmon Survey ||  || align=right data-sort-value="0.82" | 820 m || 
|-id=664 bgcolor=#E9E9E9
| 534664 ||  || — || October 28, 2014 || Haleakala || Pan-STARRS ||  || align=right data-sort-value="0.77" | 770 m || 
|-id=665 bgcolor=#E9E9E9
| 534665 ||  || — || October 29, 2014 || Catalina || CSS ||  || align=right data-sort-value="0.98" | 980 m || 
|-id=666 bgcolor=#E9E9E9
| 534666 ||  || — || July 16, 2013 || Haleakala || Pan-STARRS ||  || align=right | 1.6 km || 
|-id=667 bgcolor=#E9E9E9
| 534667 ||  || — || October 30, 2014 || Mount Lemmon || Mount Lemmon Survey ||  || align=right | 1.3 km || 
|-id=668 bgcolor=#E9E9E9
| 534668 ||  || — || October 30, 2014 || Mount Lemmon || Mount Lemmon Survey ||  || align=right | 1.5 km || 
|-id=669 bgcolor=#E9E9E9
| 534669 ||  || — || October 30, 2014 || Mount Lemmon || Mount Lemmon Survey ||  || align=right | 1.1 km || 
|-id=670 bgcolor=#fefefe
| 534670 ||  || — || October 25, 2014 || Kitt Peak || Spacewatch ||  || align=right data-sort-value="0.73" | 730 m || 
|-id=671 bgcolor=#fefefe
| 534671 ||  || — || October 28, 2014 || Haleakala || Pan-STARRS ||  || align=right data-sort-value="0.50" | 500 m || 
|-id=672 bgcolor=#E9E9E9
| 534672 ||  || — || December 15, 2001 || Socorro || LINEAR ||  || align=right | 1.5 km || 
|-id=673 bgcolor=#E9E9E9
| 534673 ||  || — || November 3, 2014 || Mount Lemmon || Mount Lemmon Survey ||  || align=right | 1.0 km || 
|-id=674 bgcolor=#FA8072
| 534674 ||  || — || March 1, 2011 || Catalina || CSS ||  || align=right | 1.0 km || 
|-id=675 bgcolor=#d6d6d6
| 534675 ||  || — || September 4, 2008 || Kitt Peak || Spacewatch ||  || align=right | 2.8 km || 
|-id=676 bgcolor=#FFC2E0
| 534676 ||  || — || October 26, 2014 || WISE || WISE || APO || align=right data-sort-value="0.69" | 690 m || 
|-id=677 bgcolor=#E9E9E9
| 534677 ||  || — || December 5, 2010 || Mount Lemmon || Mount Lemmon Survey ||  || align=right data-sort-value="0.90" | 900 m || 
|-id=678 bgcolor=#FA8072
| 534678 ||  || — || March 13, 2007 || Mount Lemmon || Mount Lemmon Survey ||  || align=right | 1.4 km || 
|-id=679 bgcolor=#E9E9E9
| 534679 ||  || — || November 22, 2006 || Kitt Peak || Spacewatch ||  || align=right data-sort-value="0.62" | 620 m || 
|-id=680 bgcolor=#E9E9E9
| 534680 ||  || — || October 30, 2005 || Kitt Peak || Spacewatch ||  || align=right | 1.8 km || 
|-id=681 bgcolor=#E9E9E9
| 534681 ||  || — || October 3, 2014 || Mount Lemmon || Mount Lemmon Survey ||  || align=right | 1.2 km || 
|-id=682 bgcolor=#E9E9E9
| 534682 ||  || — || April 27, 2012 || Haleakala || Pan-STARRS ||  || align=right | 1.0 km || 
|-id=683 bgcolor=#E9E9E9
| 534683 ||  || — || November 12, 2006 || Mount Lemmon || Mount Lemmon Survey ||  || align=right data-sort-value="0.71" | 710 m || 
|-id=684 bgcolor=#E9E9E9
| 534684 ||  || — || September 22, 2009 || Kitt Peak || Spacewatch ||  || align=right | 1.8 km || 
|-id=685 bgcolor=#FA8072
| 534685 ||  || — || November 12, 2014 || Haleakala || Pan-STARRS ||  || align=right | 1.7 km || 
|-id=686 bgcolor=#E9E9E9
| 534686 ||  || — || February 26, 2012 || Kitt Peak || Spacewatch ||  || align=right data-sort-value="0.99" | 990 m || 
|-id=687 bgcolor=#fefefe
| 534687 ||  || — || February 11, 2004 || Kitt Peak || Spacewatch ||  || align=right data-sort-value="0.68" | 680 m || 
|-id=688 bgcolor=#E9E9E9
| 534688 ||  || — || September 29, 2009 || Kitt Peak || Spacewatch ||  || align=right | 2.8 km || 
|-id=689 bgcolor=#E9E9E9
| 534689 ||  || — || November 3, 2010 || Kitt Peak || Spacewatch ||  || align=right data-sort-value="0.83" | 830 m || 
|-id=690 bgcolor=#fefefe
| 534690 ||  || — || November 23, 1995 || Kitt Peak || Spacewatch ||  || align=right data-sort-value="0.74" | 740 m || 
|-id=691 bgcolor=#E9E9E9
| 534691 ||  || — || October 21, 2006 || Mount Lemmon || Mount Lemmon Survey ||  || align=right | 1.9 km || 
|-id=692 bgcolor=#E9E9E9
| 534692 ||  || — || December 18, 2001 || Socorro || LINEAR ||  || align=right | 1.4 km || 
|-id=693 bgcolor=#fefefe
| 534693 ||  || — || October 19, 2003 || Kitt Peak || Spacewatch ||  || align=right data-sort-value="0.64" | 640 m || 
|-id=694 bgcolor=#E9E9E9
| 534694 ||  || — || April 27, 2008 || Kitt Peak || Spacewatch ||  || align=right | 1.8 km || 
|-id=695 bgcolor=#fefefe
| 534695 ||  || — || April 15, 2013 || Haleakala || Pan-STARRS ||  || align=right | 1.0 km || 
|-id=696 bgcolor=#fefefe
| 534696 ||  || — || August 31, 2014 || Haleakala || Pan-STARRS ||  || align=right data-sort-value="0.76" | 760 m || 
|-id=697 bgcolor=#E9E9E9
| 534697 ||  || — || December 6, 2010 || Mount Lemmon || Mount Lemmon Survey ||  || align=right | 1.9 km || 
|-id=698 bgcolor=#d6d6d6
| 534698 ||  || — || April 27, 2012 || Haleakala || Pan-STARRS ||  || align=right | 3.0 km || 
|-id=699 bgcolor=#E9E9E9
| 534699 ||  || — || October 20, 2014 || Mount Lemmon || Mount Lemmon Survey ||  || align=right | 1.7 km || 
|-id=700 bgcolor=#fefefe
| 534700 ||  || — || September 18, 2010 || Kitt Peak || Spacewatch ||  || align=right data-sort-value="0.62" | 620 m || 
|}

534701–534800 

|-bgcolor=#fefefe
| 534701 ||  || — || September 15, 2007 || Mount Lemmon || Mount Lemmon Survey ||  || align=right data-sort-value="0.94" | 940 m || 
|-id=702 bgcolor=#E9E9E9
| 534702 ||  || — || December 22, 2006 || Socorro || LINEAR ||  || align=right data-sort-value="0.87" | 870 m || 
|-id=703 bgcolor=#fefefe
| 534703 ||  || — || January 30, 2012 || Kitt Peak || Spacewatch ||  || align=right data-sort-value="0.55" | 550 m || 
|-id=704 bgcolor=#fefefe
| 534704 ||  || — || November 5, 2007 || Mount Lemmon || Mount Lemmon Survey ||  || align=right data-sort-value="0.58" | 580 m || 
|-id=705 bgcolor=#fefefe
| 534705 ||  || — || November 5, 2007 || Mount Lemmon || Mount Lemmon Survey ||  || align=right data-sort-value="0.64" | 640 m || 
|-id=706 bgcolor=#E9E9E9
| 534706 ||  || — || June 17, 2013 || Haleakala || Pan-STARRS ||  || align=right | 1.5 km || 
|-id=707 bgcolor=#fefefe
| 534707 ||  || — || February 27, 2012 || Kitt Peak || Spacewatch ||  || align=right data-sort-value="0.58" | 580 m || 
|-id=708 bgcolor=#fefefe
| 534708 ||  || — || January 11, 2008 || Kitt Peak || Spacewatch ||  || align=right data-sort-value="0.50" | 500 m || 
|-id=709 bgcolor=#fefefe
| 534709 ||  || — || September 29, 1992 || Kitt Peak || Spacewatch ||  || align=right data-sort-value="0.68" | 680 m || 
|-id=710 bgcolor=#fefefe
| 534710 ||  || — || December 13, 2007 || Socorro || LINEAR ||  || align=right data-sort-value="0.79" | 790 m || 
|-id=711 bgcolor=#fefefe
| 534711 ||  || — || October 29, 2003 || Kitt Peak || Spacewatch ||  || align=right data-sort-value="0.76" | 760 m || 
|-id=712 bgcolor=#E9E9E9
| 534712 ||  || — || November 18, 2001 || Kitt Peak || Spacewatch ||  || align=right | 1.2 km || 
|-id=713 bgcolor=#E9E9E9
| 534713 ||  || — || November 12, 2014 || Haleakala || Pan-STARRS ||  || align=right | 1.1 km || 
|-id=714 bgcolor=#E9E9E9
| 534714 ||  || — || June 1, 2008 || Kitt Peak || Spacewatch ||  || align=right | 1.0 km || 
|-id=715 bgcolor=#E9E9E9
| 534715 ||  || — || December 3, 2010 || Catalina || CSS ||  || align=right | 1.7 km || 
|-id=716 bgcolor=#E9E9E9
| 534716 ||  || — || October 22, 2014 || Mount Lemmon || Mount Lemmon Survey ||  || align=right data-sort-value="0.91" | 910 m || 
|-id=717 bgcolor=#E9E9E9
| 534717 ||  || — || November 20, 2001 || Socorro || LINEAR ||  || align=right | 1.6 km || 
|-id=718 bgcolor=#fefefe
| 534718 ||  || — || November 19, 2003 || Kitt Peak || Spacewatch ||  || align=right data-sort-value="0.70" | 700 m || 
|-id=719 bgcolor=#E9E9E9
| 534719 ||  || — || November 15, 2010 || Kitt Peak || Spacewatch ||  || align=right data-sort-value="0.86" | 860 m || 
|-id=720 bgcolor=#fefefe
| 534720 ||  || — || February 2, 2008 || Kitt Peak || Spacewatch ||  || align=right data-sort-value="0.70" | 700 m || 
|-id=721 bgcolor=#fefefe
| 534721 ||  || — || February 2, 2008 || Kitt Peak || Spacewatch ||  || align=right data-sort-value="0.75" | 750 m || 
|-id=722 bgcolor=#E9E9E9
| 534722 ||  || — || October 19, 2014 || Kitt Peak || Spacewatch ||  || align=right | 1.3 km || 
|-id=723 bgcolor=#E9E9E9
| 534723 ||  || — || November 14, 2014 || Kitt Peak || Spacewatch ||  || align=right data-sort-value="0.96" | 960 m || 
|-id=724 bgcolor=#E9E9E9
| 534724 ||  || — || November 14, 2014 || Kitt Peak || Spacewatch ||  || align=right data-sort-value="0.90" | 900 m || 
|-id=725 bgcolor=#E9E9E9
| 534725 ||  || — || October 25, 2005 || Kitt Peak || Spacewatch ||  || align=right | 1.4 km || 
|-id=726 bgcolor=#E9E9E9
| 534726 ||  || — || December 16, 2006 || Mount Lemmon || Mount Lemmon Survey ||  || align=right | 1.2 km || 
|-id=727 bgcolor=#E9E9E9
| 534727 ||  || — || October 23, 2006 || Mount Lemmon || Mount Lemmon Survey ||  || align=right | 1.2 km || 
|-id=728 bgcolor=#E9E9E9
| 534728 ||  || — || November 14, 2010 || Kitt Peak || Spacewatch ||  || align=right data-sort-value="0.84" | 840 m || 
|-id=729 bgcolor=#fefefe
| 534729 ||  || — || October 13, 2007 || Mount Lemmon || Mount Lemmon Survey ||  || align=right data-sort-value="0.58" | 580 m || 
|-id=730 bgcolor=#E9E9E9
| 534730 ||  || — || November 1, 2014 || Mount Lemmon || Mount Lemmon Survey ||  || align=right | 1.8 km || 
|-id=731 bgcolor=#E9E9E9
| 534731 ||  || — || December 11, 2009 || Mount Lemmon || Mount Lemmon Survey ||  || align=right | 2.8 km || 
|-id=732 bgcolor=#fefefe
| 534732 ||  || — || October 7, 2007 || Mount Lemmon || Mount Lemmon Survey ||  || align=right data-sort-value="0.58" | 580 m || 
|-id=733 bgcolor=#fefefe
| 534733 ||  || — || August 31, 2014 || Haleakala || Pan-STARRS ||  || align=right data-sort-value="0.64" | 640 m || 
|-id=734 bgcolor=#E9E9E9
| 534734 ||  || — || September 14, 2005 || Kitt Peak || Spacewatch ||  || align=right | 1.1 km || 
|-id=735 bgcolor=#E9E9E9
| 534735 ||  || — || July 28, 2014 || Haleakala || Pan-STARRS ||  || align=right | 1.5 km || 
|-id=736 bgcolor=#E9E9E9
| 534736 ||  || — || August 31, 2014 || Haleakala || Pan-STARRS ||  || align=right data-sort-value="0.97" | 970 m || 
|-id=737 bgcolor=#E9E9E9
| 534737 ||  || — || May 11, 2012 || Kitt Peak || Spacewatch ||  || align=right | 1.1 km || 
|-id=738 bgcolor=#E9E9E9
| 534738 ||  || — || December 2, 2010 || Mount Lemmon || Mount Lemmon Survey ||  || align=right data-sort-value="0.86" | 860 m || 
|-id=739 bgcolor=#E9E9E9
| 534739 ||  || — || December 23, 2006 || Mount Lemmon || Mount Lemmon Survey ||  || align=right data-sort-value="0.72" | 720 m || 
|-id=740 bgcolor=#fefefe
| 534740 ||  || — || January 27, 2012 || Kitt Peak || Spacewatch ||  || align=right data-sort-value="0.57" | 570 m || 
|-id=741 bgcolor=#E9E9E9
| 534741 ||  || — || March 15, 2004 || Kitt Peak || Spacewatch ||  || align=right | 1.8 km || 
|-id=742 bgcolor=#E9E9E9
| 534742 ||  || — || November 15, 2006 || Kitt Peak || Spacewatch ||  || align=right data-sort-value="0.68" | 680 m || 
|-id=743 bgcolor=#E9E9E9
| 534743 ||  || — || September 24, 2014 || Catalina || CSS ||  || align=right | 1.5 km || 
|-id=744 bgcolor=#E9E9E9
| 534744 ||  || — || March 26, 2008 || Mount Lemmon || Mount Lemmon Survey ||  || align=right data-sort-value="0.80" | 800 m || 
|-id=745 bgcolor=#fefefe
| 534745 ||  || — || November 30, 2003 || Kitt Peak || Spacewatch ||  || align=right data-sort-value="0.54" | 540 m || 
|-id=746 bgcolor=#E9E9E9
| 534746 ||  || — || October 30, 2014 || Haleakala || Pan-STARRS ||  || align=right data-sort-value="0.90" | 900 m || 
|-id=747 bgcolor=#E9E9E9
| 534747 ||  || — || December 21, 2006 || Mount Lemmon || Mount Lemmon Survey ||  || align=right data-sort-value="0.74" | 740 m || 
|-id=748 bgcolor=#fefefe
| 534748 ||  || — || November 1, 2007 || Kitt Peak || Spacewatch ||  || align=right data-sort-value="0.71" | 710 m || 
|-id=749 bgcolor=#E9E9E9
| 534749 ||  || — || March 29, 2008 || Mount Lemmon || Mount Lemmon Survey ||  || align=right data-sort-value="0.95" | 950 m || 
|-id=750 bgcolor=#FA8072
| 534750 ||  || — || July 27, 2014 || Haleakala || Pan-STARRS ||  || align=right data-sort-value="0.88" | 880 m || 
|-id=751 bgcolor=#fefefe
| 534751 ||  || — || November 17, 2007 || Kitt Peak || Spacewatch ||  || align=right data-sort-value="0.61" | 610 m || 
|-id=752 bgcolor=#E9E9E9
| 534752 ||  || — || November 14, 2010 || Kitt Peak || Spacewatch ||  || align=right | 1.4 km || 
|-id=753 bgcolor=#E9E9E9
| 534753 ||  || — || November 17, 2014 || Mount Lemmon || Mount Lemmon Survey ||  || align=right | 1.2 km || 
|-id=754 bgcolor=#E9E9E9
| 534754 ||  || — || June 30, 2013 || Haleakala || Pan-STARRS ||  || align=right | 2.0 km || 
|-id=755 bgcolor=#E9E9E9
| 534755 ||  || — || January 25, 2007 || Kitt Peak || Spacewatch ||  || align=right | 1.6 km || 
|-id=756 bgcolor=#fefefe
| 534756 ||  || — || August 10, 2010 || Kitt Peak || Spacewatch ||  || align=right data-sort-value="0.62" | 620 m || 
|-id=757 bgcolor=#E9E9E9
| 534757 ||  || — || December 14, 2010 || Mount Lemmon || Mount Lemmon Survey ||  || align=right data-sort-value="0.78" | 780 m || 
|-id=758 bgcolor=#fefefe
| 534758 ||  || — || October 24, 2007 || Mount Lemmon || Mount Lemmon Survey ||  || align=right data-sort-value="0.66" | 660 m || 
|-id=759 bgcolor=#E9E9E9
| 534759 ||  || — || October 18, 2014 || Mount Lemmon || Mount Lemmon Survey ||  || align=right | 2.0 km || 
|-id=760 bgcolor=#fefefe
| 534760 ||  || — || January 19, 2012 || Haleakala || Pan-STARRS ||  || align=right data-sort-value="0.58" | 580 m || 
|-id=761 bgcolor=#fefefe
| 534761 ||  || — || November 12, 1999 || Socorro || LINEAR ||  || align=right data-sort-value="0.55" | 550 m || 
|-id=762 bgcolor=#E9E9E9
| 534762 ||  || — || April 27, 2012 || Haleakala || Pan-STARRS ||  || align=right | 1.2 km || 
|-id=763 bgcolor=#E9E9E9
| 534763 ||  || — || August 28, 2005 || Kitt Peak || Spacewatch ||  || align=right | 1.2 km || 
|-id=764 bgcolor=#E9E9E9
| 534764 ||  || — || May 23, 2012 || Mount Lemmon || Mount Lemmon Survey ||  || align=right | 1.1 km || 
|-id=765 bgcolor=#d6d6d6
| 534765 ||  || — || October 25, 2014 || Kitt Peak || Spacewatch ||  || align=right | 3.3 km || 
|-id=766 bgcolor=#fefefe
| 534766 ||  || — || October 23, 2014 || Kitt Peak || Spacewatch ||  || align=right data-sort-value="0.59" | 590 m || 
|-id=767 bgcolor=#E9E9E9
| 534767 ||  || — || August 30, 2005 || Kitt Peak || Spacewatch ||  || align=right | 1.2 km || 
|-id=768 bgcolor=#E9E9E9
| 534768 ||  || — || November 25, 2005 || Kitt Peak || Spacewatch ||  || align=right | 2.5 km || 
|-id=769 bgcolor=#E9E9E9
| 534769 ||  || — || December 13, 2010 || Mount Lemmon || Mount Lemmon Survey ||  || align=right | 1.3 km || 
|-id=770 bgcolor=#E9E9E9
| 534770 ||  || — || November 8, 2010 || Mount Lemmon || Mount Lemmon Survey ||  || align=right data-sort-value="0.88" | 880 m || 
|-id=771 bgcolor=#fefefe
| 534771 ||  || — || May 16, 2013 || Kitt Peak || Spacewatch ||  || align=right data-sort-value="0.97" | 970 m || 
|-id=772 bgcolor=#fefefe
| 534772 ||  || — || November 9, 2007 || Kitt Peak || Spacewatch ||  || align=right data-sort-value="0.50" | 500 m || 
|-id=773 bgcolor=#fefefe
| 534773 ||  || — || June 9, 2010 || WISE || WISE ||  || align=right | 1.8 km || 
|-id=774 bgcolor=#E9E9E9
| 534774 ||  || — || November 8, 2010 || Kitt Peak || Spacewatch ||  || align=right data-sort-value="0.71" | 710 m || 
|-id=775 bgcolor=#fefefe
| 534775 ||  || — || October 8, 2010 || Kitt Peak || Spacewatch ||  || align=right data-sort-value="0.62" | 620 m || 
|-id=776 bgcolor=#fefefe
| 534776 ||  || — || February 12, 2004 || Kitt Peak || Spacewatch ||  || align=right data-sort-value="0.67" | 670 m || 
|-id=777 bgcolor=#fefefe
| 534777 ||  || — || November 15, 1995 || Kitt Peak || Spacewatch ||  || align=right data-sort-value="0.66" | 660 m || 
|-id=778 bgcolor=#E9E9E9
| 534778 ||  || — || April 16, 2013 || Haleakala || Pan-STARRS ||  || align=right data-sort-value="0.86" | 860 m || 
|-id=779 bgcolor=#fefefe
| 534779 ||  || — || October 18, 2014 || Mount Lemmon || Mount Lemmon Survey ||  || align=right data-sort-value="0.55" | 550 m || 
|-id=780 bgcolor=#E9E9E9
| 534780 ||  || — || November 18, 2006 || Kitt Peak || Spacewatch ||  || align=right data-sort-value="0.94" | 940 m || 
|-id=781 bgcolor=#E9E9E9
| 534781 ||  || — || June 4, 2013 || Mount Lemmon || Mount Lemmon Survey ||  || align=right data-sort-value="0.73" | 730 m || 
|-id=782 bgcolor=#fefefe
| 534782 ||  || — || January 2, 2012 || Kitt Peak || Spacewatch ||  || align=right data-sort-value="0.49" | 490 m || 
|-id=783 bgcolor=#fefefe
| 534783 ||  || — || January 13, 2008 || Kitt Peak || Spacewatch ||  || align=right data-sort-value="0.46" | 460 m || 
|-id=784 bgcolor=#E9E9E9
| 534784 ||  || — || April 23, 2004 || Campo Imperatore || CINEOS ||  || align=right | 2.0 km || 
|-id=785 bgcolor=#fefefe
| 534785 ||  || — || November 5, 2007 || Mount Lemmon || Mount Lemmon Survey ||  || align=right data-sort-value="0.60" | 600 m || 
|-id=786 bgcolor=#fefefe
| 534786 ||  || — || September 3, 2010 || Mount Lemmon || Mount Lemmon Survey ||  || align=right data-sort-value="0.55" | 550 m || 
|-id=787 bgcolor=#E9E9E9
| 534787 ||  || — || March 30, 2008 || Kitt Peak || Spacewatch ||  || align=right data-sort-value="0.85" | 850 m || 
|-id=788 bgcolor=#E9E9E9
| 534788 ||  || — || March 8, 2008 || Mount Lemmon || Mount Lemmon Survey ||  || align=right data-sort-value="0.85" | 850 m || 
|-id=789 bgcolor=#fefefe
| 534789 ||  || — || November 4, 2004 || Kitt Peak || Spacewatch ||  || align=right data-sort-value="0.48" | 480 m || 
|-id=790 bgcolor=#E9E9E9
| 534790 ||  || — || December 13, 2010 || Mount Lemmon || Mount Lemmon Survey ||  || align=right data-sort-value="0.82" | 820 m || 
|-id=791 bgcolor=#E9E9E9
| 534791 ||  || — || November 19, 2006 || Kitt Peak || Spacewatch ||  || align=right data-sort-value="0.78" | 780 m || 
|-id=792 bgcolor=#C2FFFF
| 534792 ||  || — || October 2, 2014 || Haleakala || Pan-STARRS || L5 || align=right | 6.8 km || 
|-id=793 bgcolor=#fefefe
| 534793 ||  || — || September 18, 2010 || Mount Lemmon || Mount Lemmon Survey ||  || align=right data-sort-value="0.71" | 710 m || 
|-id=794 bgcolor=#E9E9E9
| 534794 ||  || — || December 1, 2010 || Mount Lemmon || Mount Lemmon Survey ||  || align=right | 1.4 km || 
|-id=795 bgcolor=#E9E9E9
| 534795 ||  || — || June 18, 2013 || Haleakala || Pan-STARRS ||  || align=right | 1.4 km || 
|-id=796 bgcolor=#E9E9E9
| 534796 ||  || — || October 5, 2005 || Mount Lemmon || Mount Lemmon Survey ||  || align=right | 1.2 km || 
|-id=797 bgcolor=#E9E9E9
| 534797 ||  || — || November 18, 2006 || Mount Lemmon || Mount Lemmon Survey || EUN || align=right data-sort-value="0.70" | 700 m || 
|-id=798 bgcolor=#fefefe
| 534798 ||  || — || March 13, 2005 || Kitt Peak || Spacewatch ||  || align=right data-sort-value="0.74" | 740 m || 
|-id=799 bgcolor=#E9E9E9
| 534799 ||  || — || October 31, 2006 || Mount Lemmon || Mount Lemmon Survey ||  || align=right data-sort-value="0.65" | 650 m || 
|-id=800 bgcolor=#E9E9E9
| 534800 ||  || — || November 7, 2010 || Mount Lemmon || Mount Lemmon Survey ||  || align=right data-sort-value="0.82" | 820 m || 
|}

534801–534900 

|-bgcolor=#E9E9E9
| 534801 ||  || — || January 2, 2011 || Catalina || CSS ||  || align=right | 1.6 km || 
|-id=802 bgcolor=#E9E9E9
| 534802 ||  || — || September 23, 2009 || Kitt Peak || Spacewatch ||  || align=right | 1.9 km || 
|-id=803 bgcolor=#E9E9E9
| 534803 ||  || — || September 29, 2005 || Catalina || CSS ||  || align=right | 2.4 km || 
|-id=804 bgcolor=#E9E9E9
| 534804 ||  || — || August 31, 2014 || Haleakala || Pan-STARRS ||  || align=right data-sort-value="0.96" | 960 m || 
|-id=805 bgcolor=#fefefe
| 534805 ||  || — || January 29, 2012 || Kitt Peak || Spacewatch ||  || align=right data-sort-value="0.72" | 720 m || 
|-id=806 bgcolor=#E9E9E9
| 534806 ||  || — || December 3, 2010 || Mount Lemmon || Mount Lemmon Survey ||  || align=right | 1.4 km || 
|-id=807 bgcolor=#E9E9E9
| 534807 ||  || — || March 15, 2007 || Mount Lemmon || Mount Lemmon Survey ||  || align=right | 2.6 km || 
|-id=808 bgcolor=#E9E9E9
| 534808 ||  || — || November 16, 2014 || Kitt Peak || Spacewatch || (5) || align=right data-sort-value="0.97" | 970 m || 
|-id=809 bgcolor=#E9E9E9
| 534809 ||  || — || April 24, 2008 || Mount Lemmon || Mount Lemmon Survey || KON || align=right | 2.7 km || 
|-id=810 bgcolor=#E9E9E9
| 534810 ||  || — || July 14, 2009 || Kitt Peak || Spacewatch ||  || align=right | 1.5 km || 
|-id=811 bgcolor=#fefefe
| 534811 ||  || — || February 26, 2012 || Haleakala || Pan-STARRS ||  || align=right data-sort-value="0.55" | 550 m || 
|-id=812 bgcolor=#E9E9E9
| 534812 ||  || — || November 1, 2014 || Mount Lemmon || Mount Lemmon Survey || EUN || align=right | 1.3 km || 
|-id=813 bgcolor=#E9E9E9
| 534813 ||  || — || December 15, 2006 || Kitt Peak || Spacewatch ||  || align=right data-sort-value="0.81" | 810 m || 
|-id=814 bgcolor=#fefefe
| 534814 ||  || — || March 1, 2009 || Kitt Peak || Spacewatch ||  || align=right data-sort-value="0.54" | 540 m || 
|-id=815 bgcolor=#E9E9E9
| 534815 ||  || — || January 16, 2011 || Mount Lemmon || Mount Lemmon Survey ||  || align=right | 1.2 km || 
|-id=816 bgcolor=#fefefe
| 534816 ||  || — || February 27, 2012 || Haleakala || Pan-STARRS ||  || align=right data-sort-value="0.52" | 520 m || 
|-id=817 bgcolor=#E9E9E9
| 534817 ||  || — || November 17, 2014 || Haleakala || Pan-STARRS ||  || align=right | 1.6 km || 
|-id=818 bgcolor=#E9E9E9
| 534818 ||  || — || September 9, 2014 || Haleakala || Pan-STARRS || (5) || align=right data-sort-value="0.83" | 830 m || 
|-id=819 bgcolor=#E9E9E9
| 534819 ||  || — || May 17, 2012 || Mount Lemmon || Mount Lemmon Survey ||  || align=right | 2.3 km || 
|-id=820 bgcolor=#fefefe
| 534820 ||  || — || September 2, 2010 || Mount Lemmon || Mount Lemmon Survey ||  || align=right data-sort-value="0.58" | 580 m || 
|-id=821 bgcolor=#E9E9E9
| 534821 ||  || — || September 6, 2014 || Mount Lemmon || Mount Lemmon Survey ||  || align=right | 1.3 km || 
|-id=822 bgcolor=#fefefe
| 534822 ||  || — || September 30, 2014 || Mount Lemmon || Mount Lemmon Survey || NYS || align=right data-sort-value="0.51" | 510 m || 
|-id=823 bgcolor=#E9E9E9
| 534823 ||  || — || August 31, 2005 || Kitt Peak || Spacewatch ||  || align=right | 1.1 km || 
|-id=824 bgcolor=#E9E9E9
| 534824 ||  || — || December 13, 2010 || Mount Lemmon || Mount Lemmon Survey || EUN || align=right | 1.1 km || 
|-id=825 bgcolor=#E9E9E9
| 534825 ||  || — || November 25, 2006 || Mount Lemmon || Mount Lemmon Survey ||  || align=right data-sort-value="0.95" | 950 m || 
|-id=826 bgcolor=#fefefe
| 534826 ||  || — || August 31, 2014 || Haleakala || Pan-STARRS ||  || align=right data-sort-value="0.69" | 690 m || 
|-id=827 bgcolor=#E9E9E9
| 534827 ||  || — || March 27, 2003 || Kitt Peak || Spacewatch ||  || align=right | 1.4 km || 
|-id=828 bgcolor=#E9E9E9
| 534828 ||  || — || December 10, 2010 || Mount Lemmon || Mount Lemmon Survey ||  || align=right | 1.4 km || 
|-id=829 bgcolor=#fefefe
| 534829 ||  || — || October 17, 2007 || Anderson Mesa || LONEOS ||  || align=right data-sort-value="0.59" | 590 m || 
|-id=830 bgcolor=#E9E9E9
| 534830 ||  || — || November 20, 2014 || Mount Lemmon || Mount Lemmon Survey ||  || align=right | 1.1 km || 
|-id=831 bgcolor=#E9E9E9
| 534831 ||  || — || November 4, 2005 || Kitt Peak || Spacewatch ||  || align=right | 1.2 km || 
|-id=832 bgcolor=#E9E9E9
| 534832 ||  || — || November 1, 2006 || Mount Lemmon || Mount Lemmon Survey ||  || align=right data-sort-value="0.60" | 600 m || 
|-id=833 bgcolor=#E9E9E9
| 534833 ||  || — || November 20, 2014 || Haleakala || Pan-STARRS ||  || align=right data-sort-value="0.75" | 750 m || 
|-id=834 bgcolor=#E9E9E9
| 534834 ||  || — || September 22, 2014 || Haleakala || Pan-STARRS || EUN || align=right | 1.1 km || 
|-id=835 bgcolor=#E9E9E9
| 534835 ||  || — || September 24, 2009 || Mount Lemmon || Mount Lemmon Survey ||  || align=right | 1.4 km || 
|-id=836 bgcolor=#E9E9E9
| 534836 ||  || — || January 12, 2011 || Mount Lemmon || Mount Lemmon Survey ||  || align=right data-sort-value="0.80" | 800 m || 
|-id=837 bgcolor=#E9E9E9
| 534837 ||  || — || September 22, 2014 || Haleakala || Pan-STARRS ||  || align=right | 1.3 km || 
|-id=838 bgcolor=#E9E9E9
| 534838 ||  || — || December 3, 2010 || Kitt Peak || Spacewatch ||  || align=right | 1.3 km || 
|-id=839 bgcolor=#E9E9E9
| 534839 ||  || — || July 31, 2014 || Haleakala || Pan-STARRS ||  || align=right | 1.3 km || 
|-id=840 bgcolor=#E9E9E9
| 534840 ||  || — || November 8, 2010 || Mount Lemmon || Mount Lemmon Survey ||  || align=right | 2.0 km || 
|-id=841 bgcolor=#E9E9E9
| 534841 ||  || — || July 31, 2014 || Haleakala || Pan-STARRS ||  || align=right data-sort-value="0.98" | 980 m || 
|-id=842 bgcolor=#E9E9E9
| 534842 ||  || — || November 1, 2014 || Mount Lemmon || Mount Lemmon Survey ||  || align=right data-sort-value="0.90" | 900 m || 
|-id=843 bgcolor=#E9E9E9
| 534843 ||  || — || November 30, 2010 || Mount Lemmon || Mount Lemmon Survey ||  || align=right | 1.1 km || 
|-id=844 bgcolor=#fefefe
| 534844 ||  || — || February 3, 2012 || Haleakala || Pan-STARRS ||  || align=right data-sort-value="0.47" | 470 m || 
|-id=845 bgcolor=#E9E9E9
| 534845 ||  || — || September 14, 2009 || Catalina || CSS ||  || align=right | 2.5 km || 
|-id=846 bgcolor=#E9E9E9
| 534846 ||  || — || September 20, 2009 || Kitt Peak || Spacewatch ||  || align=right | 2.0 km || 
|-id=847 bgcolor=#E9E9E9
| 534847 ||  || — || October 1, 2005 || Kitt Peak || Spacewatch ||  || align=right | 1.1 km || 
|-id=848 bgcolor=#E9E9E9
| 534848 ||  || — || December 8, 2010 || Kitt Peak || Spacewatch ||  || align=right data-sort-value="0.79" | 790 m || 
|-id=849 bgcolor=#E9E9E9
| 534849 ||  || — || November 12, 2014 || Haleakala || Pan-STARRS ||  || align=right data-sort-value="0.86" | 860 m || 
|-id=850 bgcolor=#E9E9E9
| 534850 ||  || — || November 11, 2006 || Mount Lemmon || Mount Lemmon Survey ||  || align=right data-sort-value="0.86" | 860 m || 
|-id=851 bgcolor=#E9E9E9
| 534851 ||  || — || October 14, 2010 || Mount Lemmon || Mount Lemmon Survey ||  || align=right | 1.3 km || 
|-id=852 bgcolor=#E9E9E9
| 534852 ||  || — || April 28, 2012 || Mount Lemmon || Mount Lemmon Survey || EUN || align=right | 1.0 km || 
|-id=853 bgcolor=#fefefe
| 534853 ||  || — || December 31, 2007 || Kitt Peak || Spacewatch ||  || align=right data-sort-value="0.59" | 590 m || 
|-id=854 bgcolor=#E9E9E9
| 534854 ||  || — || December 14, 2010 || Mount Lemmon || Mount Lemmon Survey ||  || align=right data-sort-value="0.96" | 960 m || 
|-id=855 bgcolor=#E9E9E9
| 534855 ||  || — || May 12, 2012 || Haleakala || Pan-STARRS ||  || align=right | 2.2 km || 
|-id=856 bgcolor=#fefefe
| 534856 ||  || — || November 3, 1999 || Kitt Peak || Spacewatch ||  || align=right data-sort-value="0.53" | 530 m || 
|-id=857 bgcolor=#fefefe
| 534857 ||  || — || July 10, 2010 || WISE || WISE ||  || align=right data-sort-value="0.75" | 750 m || 
|-id=858 bgcolor=#E9E9E9
| 534858 ||  || — || October 4, 2014 || Catalina || CSS ||  || align=right | 1.7 km || 
|-id=859 bgcolor=#fefefe
| 534859 ||  || — || February 21, 2012 || Kitt Peak || Spacewatch ||  || align=right data-sort-value="0.72" | 720 m || 
|-id=860 bgcolor=#E9E9E9
| 534860 ||  || — || October 10, 2005 || Catalina || CSS ||  || align=right | 1.7 km || 
|-id=861 bgcolor=#E9E9E9
| 534861 ||  || — || August 31, 2005 || Kitt Peak || Spacewatch ||  || align=right data-sort-value="0.89" | 890 m || 
|-id=862 bgcolor=#fefefe
| 534862 ||  || — || January 13, 2005 || Kitt Peak || Spacewatch ||  || align=right data-sort-value="0.57" | 570 m || 
|-id=863 bgcolor=#E9E9E9
| 534863 ||  || — || November 5, 2010 || Mount Lemmon || Mount Lemmon Survey ||  || align=right | 1.7 km || 
|-id=864 bgcolor=#E9E9E9
| 534864 ||  || — || October 31, 2005 || Mount Lemmon || Mount Lemmon Survey || EUN || align=right data-sort-value="0.87" | 870 m || 
|-id=865 bgcolor=#E9E9E9
| 534865 ||  || — || May 8, 2013 || Haleakala || Pan-STARRS ||  || align=right | 1.1 km || 
|-id=866 bgcolor=#E9E9E9
| 534866 ||  || — || January 2, 2011 || Catalina || CSS ||  || align=right | 1.7 km || 
|-id=867 bgcolor=#E9E9E9
| 534867 ||  || — || December 6, 2010 || Mount Lemmon || Mount Lemmon Survey ||  || align=right data-sort-value="0.83" | 830 m || 
|-id=868 bgcolor=#fefefe
| 534868 ||  || — || January 27, 2012 || Mount Lemmon || Mount Lemmon Survey || V || align=right data-sort-value="0.49" | 490 m || 
|-id=869 bgcolor=#E9E9E9
| 534869 ||  || — || October 3, 2014 || Mount Lemmon || Mount Lemmon Survey || EUN || align=right data-sort-value="0.95" | 950 m || 
|-id=870 bgcolor=#E9E9E9
| 534870 ||  || — || October 3, 2014 || Mount Lemmon || Mount Lemmon Survey || KON || align=right | 2.0 km || 
|-id=871 bgcolor=#E9E9E9
| 534871 ||  || — || September 22, 2014 || Haleakala || Pan-STARRS ||  || align=right | 1.4 km || 
|-id=872 bgcolor=#E9E9E9
| 534872 ||  || — || November 8, 2010 || Mount Lemmon || Mount Lemmon Survey || critical || align=right data-sort-value="0.86" | 860 m || 
|-id=873 bgcolor=#E9E9E9
| 534873 ||  || — || February 17, 2007 || Mount Lemmon || Mount Lemmon Survey ||  || align=right | 1.0 km || 
|-id=874 bgcolor=#E9E9E9
| 534874 ||  || — || December 3, 2010 || Kitt Peak || Spacewatch ||  || align=right | 1.1 km || 
|-id=875 bgcolor=#E9E9E9
| 534875 ||  || — || January 27, 2007 || Kitt Peak || Spacewatch ||  || align=right | 1.3 km || 
|-id=876 bgcolor=#E9E9E9
| 534876 ||  || — || September 4, 2014 || Haleakala || Pan-STARRS ||  || align=right | 2.2 km || 
|-id=877 bgcolor=#d6d6d6
| 534877 ||  || — || March 28, 2010 || WISE || WISE ||  || align=right | 2.7 km || 
|-id=878 bgcolor=#E9E9E9
| 534878 ||  || — || December 4, 2010 || Mount Lemmon || Mount Lemmon Survey || (5) || align=right data-sort-value="0.91" | 910 m || 
|-id=879 bgcolor=#fefefe
| 534879 ||  || — || February 13, 2009 || Kitt Peak || Spacewatch ||  || align=right | 1.6 km || 
|-id=880 bgcolor=#E9E9E9
| 534880 ||  || — || September 4, 2014 || Haleakala || Pan-STARRS ||  || align=right | 1.6 km || 
|-id=881 bgcolor=#E9E9E9
| 534881 ||  || — || September 22, 2014 || Haleakala || Pan-STARRS || (5) || align=right data-sort-value="0.97" | 970 m || 
|-id=882 bgcolor=#E9E9E9
| 534882 ||  || — || October 2, 2014 || Haleakala || Pan-STARRS ||  || align=right | 1.1 km || 
|-id=883 bgcolor=#E9E9E9
| 534883 ||  || — || September 30, 2005 || Mount Lemmon || Mount Lemmon Survey ||  || align=right | 1.0 km || 
|-id=884 bgcolor=#E9E9E9
| 534884 ||  || — || September 29, 1973 || Palomar || PLS ||  || align=right data-sort-value="0.89" | 890 m || 
|-id=885 bgcolor=#E9E9E9
| 534885 ||  || — || January 17, 2007 || Catalina || CSS ||  || align=right | 1.0 km || 
|-id=886 bgcolor=#E9E9E9
| 534886 ||  || — || December 21, 2006 || Kitt Peak || Spacewatch ||  || align=right data-sort-value="0.90" | 900 m || 
|-id=887 bgcolor=#E9E9E9
| 534887 ||  || — || September 20, 2014 || Haleakala || Pan-STARRS || EUN || align=right data-sort-value="0.93" | 930 m || 
|-id=888 bgcolor=#E9E9E9
| 534888 ||  || — || May 10, 2013 || Kitt Peak || Spacewatch ||  || align=right | 1.0 km || 
|-id=889 bgcolor=#E9E9E9
| 534889 ||  || — || September 18, 2014 || Haleakala || Pan-STARRS ||  || align=right | 1.3 km || 
|-id=890 bgcolor=#E9E9E9
| 534890 ||  || — || March 16, 2012 || Mount Lemmon || Mount Lemmon Survey ||  || align=right | 1.6 km || 
|-id=891 bgcolor=#E9E9E9
| 534891 ||  || — || October 28, 2014 || Haleakala || Pan-STARRS ||  || align=right | 2.8 km || 
|-id=892 bgcolor=#fefefe
| 534892 ||  || — || October 28, 2014 || Haleakala || Pan-STARRS ||  || align=right data-sort-value="0.66" | 660 m || 
|-id=893 bgcolor=#fefefe
| 534893 ||  || — || October 27, 2003 || Kitt Peak || Spacewatch ||  || align=right data-sort-value="0.68" | 680 m || 
|-id=894 bgcolor=#E9E9E9
| 534894 ||  || — || October 30, 2014 || Mount Lemmon || Mount Lemmon Survey || MAR || align=right data-sort-value="0.93" | 930 m || 
|-id=895 bgcolor=#E9E9E9
| 534895 ||  || — || April 21, 2013 || Haleakala || Pan-STARRS ||  || align=right | 2.3 km || 
|-id=896 bgcolor=#E9E9E9
| 534896 ||  || — || July 27, 2005 || Siding Spring || SSS || (1547) || align=right | 1.5 km || 
|-id=897 bgcolor=#E9E9E9
| 534897 ||  || — || February 25, 2007 || Mount Lemmon || Mount Lemmon Survey ||  || align=right | 2.1 km || 
|-id=898 bgcolor=#E9E9E9
| 534898 ||  || — || January 26, 2011 || Mount Lemmon || Mount Lemmon Survey ||  || align=right | 1.0 km || 
|-id=899 bgcolor=#E9E9E9
| 534899 ||  || — || December 15, 2010 || Mount Lemmon || Mount Lemmon Survey ||  || align=right data-sort-value="0.63" | 630 m || 
|-id=900 bgcolor=#E9E9E9
| 534900 ||  || — || February 21, 2007 || Mount Lemmon || Mount Lemmon Survey ||  || align=right | 1.1 km || 
|}

534901–535000 

|-bgcolor=#E9E9E9
| 534901 ||  || — || November 14, 2010 || Catalina || CSS || EUN || align=right | 1.1 km || 
|-id=902 bgcolor=#E9E9E9
| 534902 ||  || — || October 21, 2014 || Kitt Peak || Spacewatch ||  || align=right | 2.0 km || 
|-id=903 bgcolor=#E9E9E9
| 534903 ||  || — || August 29, 2014 || Haleakala || Pan-STARRS ||  || align=right data-sort-value="0.90" | 900 m || 
|-id=904 bgcolor=#E9E9E9
| 534904 ||  || — || October 26, 2014 || Haleakala || Pan-STARRS ||  || align=right | 1.5 km || 
|-id=905 bgcolor=#E9E9E9
| 534905 ||  || — || April 20, 2009 || Kitt Peak || Spacewatch ||  || align=right data-sort-value="0.98" | 980 m || 
|-id=906 bgcolor=#E9E9E9
| 534906 ||  || — || October 29, 2014 || Haleakala || Pan-STARRS || KON || align=right | 1.9 km || 
|-id=907 bgcolor=#E9E9E9
| 534907 ||  || — || September 24, 2014 || Mount Lemmon || Mount Lemmon Survey ||  || align=right | 1.2 km || 
|-id=908 bgcolor=#fefefe
| 534908 ||  || — || January 19, 2012 || Kitt Peak || Spacewatch ||  || align=right data-sort-value="0.98" | 980 m || 
|-id=909 bgcolor=#E9E9E9
| 534909 ||  || — || September 4, 2014 || Haleakala || Pan-STARRS ||  || align=right | 1.8 km || 
|-id=910 bgcolor=#E9E9E9
| 534910 ||  || — || October 6, 2005 || Mount Lemmon || Mount Lemmon Survey ||  || align=right | 2.6 km || 
|-id=911 bgcolor=#fefefe
| 534911 ||  || — || May 6, 2008 || Mount Lemmon || Mount Lemmon Survey ||  || align=right | 1.2 km || 
|-id=912 bgcolor=#fefefe
| 534912 ||  || — || November 30, 2011 || Mount Lemmon || Mount Lemmon Survey ||  || align=right data-sort-value="0.54" | 540 m || 
|-id=913 bgcolor=#E9E9E9
| 534913 ||  || — || October 24, 2014 || Catalina || CSS ||  || align=right | 1.4 km || 
|-id=914 bgcolor=#E9E9E9
| 534914 ||  || — || January 17, 2007 || Kitt Peak || Spacewatch || (5) || align=right data-sort-value="0.65" | 650 m || 
|-id=915 bgcolor=#E9E9E9
| 534915 ||  || — || October 2, 2014 || Haleakala || Pan-STARRS ||  || align=right | 1.1 km || 
|-id=916 bgcolor=#E9E9E9
| 534916 ||  || — || December 21, 2006 || Kitt Peak || Spacewatch || EUN || align=right data-sort-value="0.88" | 880 m || 
|-id=917 bgcolor=#FA8072
| 534917 ||  || — || March 15, 2007 || Kitt Peak || Spacewatch ||  || align=right data-sort-value="0.50" | 500 m || 
|-id=918 bgcolor=#E9E9E9
| 534918 ||  || — || January 28, 2010 || WISE || WISE ||  || align=right | 1.2 km || 
|-id=919 bgcolor=#E9E9E9
| 534919 ||  || — || October 26, 2014 || Mount Lemmon || Mount Lemmon Survey || ADE || align=right | 1.6 km || 
|-id=920 bgcolor=#E9E9E9
| 534920 ||  || — || November 6, 2010 || Mount Lemmon || Mount Lemmon Survey ||  || align=right | 1.7 km || 
|-id=921 bgcolor=#E9E9E9
| 534921 ||  || — || March 17, 2012 || Mount Lemmon || Mount Lemmon Survey ||  || align=right data-sort-value="0.87" | 870 m || 
|-id=922 bgcolor=#fefefe
| 534922 ||  || — || December 5, 2007 || Kitt Peak || Spacewatch ||  || align=right data-sort-value="0.62" | 620 m || 
|-id=923 bgcolor=#fefefe
| 534923 ||  || — || January 19, 2004 || Kitt Peak || Spacewatch ||  || align=right data-sort-value="0.56" | 560 m || 
|-id=924 bgcolor=#E9E9E9
| 534924 ||  || — || March 29, 2012 || Haleakala || Pan-STARRS ||  || align=right | 1.1 km || 
|-id=925 bgcolor=#fefefe
| 534925 ||  || — || October 8, 2010 || Kitt Peak || Spacewatch ||  || align=right data-sort-value="0.62" | 620 m || 
|-id=926 bgcolor=#E9E9E9
| 534926 ||  || — || February 23, 2007 || Kitt Peak || Spacewatch ||  || align=right | 1.5 km || 
|-id=927 bgcolor=#E9E9E9
| 534927 ||  || — || September 21, 2009 || Kitt Peak || Spacewatch ||  || align=right | 1.7 km || 
|-id=928 bgcolor=#E9E9E9
| 534928 ||  || — || December 14, 2001 || Socorro || LINEAR ||  || align=right | 1.8 km || 
|-id=929 bgcolor=#d6d6d6
| 534929 ||  || — || November 22, 2014 || Haleakala || Pan-STARRS ||  || align=right | 3.1 km || 
|-id=930 bgcolor=#d6d6d6
| 534930 ||  || — || November 4, 2008 || Catalina || CSS ||  || align=right | 3.2 km || 
|-id=931 bgcolor=#fefefe
| 534931 ||  || — || October 16, 2007 || Mount Lemmon || Mount Lemmon Survey || V || align=right data-sort-value="0.45" | 450 m || 
|-id=932 bgcolor=#fefefe
| 534932 ||  || — || September 18, 2014 || Haleakala || Pan-STARRS ||  || align=right data-sort-value="0.76" | 760 m || 
|-id=933 bgcolor=#E9E9E9
| 534933 ||  || — || November 27, 2006 || Kitt Peak || Spacewatch ||  || align=right data-sort-value="0.65" | 650 m || 
|-id=934 bgcolor=#E9E9E9
| 534934 ||  || — || November 28, 2010 || Kitt Peak || Spacewatch ||  || align=right data-sort-value="0.96" | 960 m || 
|-id=935 bgcolor=#fefefe
| 534935 ||  || — || May 15, 2004 || Siding Spring || SSS ||  || align=right | 1.1 km || 
|-id=936 bgcolor=#E9E9E9
| 534936 ||  || — || October 2, 2014 || Haleakala || Pan-STARRS ||  || align=right | 2.0 km || 
|-id=937 bgcolor=#E9E9E9
| 534937 ||  || — || December 5, 2005 || Catalina || CSS ||  || align=right | 1.5 km || 
|-id=938 bgcolor=#E9E9E9
| 534938 ||  || — || November 17, 2014 || Mount Lemmon || Mount Lemmon Survey ||  || align=right | 1.9 km || 
|-id=939 bgcolor=#d6d6d6
| 534939 ||  || — || April 18, 2010 || WISE || WISE ||  || align=right | 5.9 km || 
|-id=940 bgcolor=#E9E9E9
| 534940 ||  || — || November 25, 2014 || Haleakala || Pan-STARRS ||  || align=right | 1.1 km || 
|-id=941 bgcolor=#E9E9E9
| 534941 ||  || — || October 27, 2014 || Haleakala || Pan-STARRS ||  || align=right data-sort-value="0.91" | 910 m || 
|-id=942 bgcolor=#d6d6d6
| 534942 ||  || — || March 16, 2010 || Mount Lemmon || Mount Lemmon Survey || EOS || align=right | 1.9 km || 
|-id=943 bgcolor=#d6d6d6
| 534943 ||  || — || March 20, 1998 || Kitt Peak || Spacewatch ||  || align=right | 4.3 km || 
|-id=944 bgcolor=#fefefe
| 534944 ||  || — || October 2, 2010 || Mount Lemmon || Mount Lemmon Survey ||  || align=right data-sort-value="0.80" | 800 m || 
|-id=945 bgcolor=#E9E9E9
| 534945 ||  || — || November 20, 2001 || Socorro || LINEAR ||  || align=right | 1.1 km || 
|-id=946 bgcolor=#E9E9E9
| 534946 ||  || — || November 18, 2014 || Haleakala || Pan-STARRS ||  || align=right data-sort-value="0.98" | 980 m || 
|-id=947 bgcolor=#E9E9E9
| 534947 ||  || — || February 10, 2011 || Mount Lemmon || Mount Lemmon Survey ||  || align=right | 1.4 km || 
|-id=948 bgcolor=#fefefe
| 534948 ||  || — || November 9, 1999 || Kitt Peak || Spacewatch || V || align=right data-sort-value="0.59" | 590 m || 
|-id=949 bgcolor=#E9E9E9
| 534949 ||  || — || November 16, 2010 || Mount Lemmon || Mount Lemmon Survey || JUN || align=right data-sort-value="0.96" | 960 m || 
|-id=950 bgcolor=#E9E9E9
| 534950 ||  || — || September 16, 2009 || Mount Lemmon || Mount Lemmon Survey ||  || align=right | 2.5 km || 
|-id=951 bgcolor=#E9E9E9
| 534951 ||  || — || October 28, 2005 || Kitt Peak || Spacewatch ||  || align=right | 1.2 km || 
|-id=952 bgcolor=#E9E9E9
| 534952 ||  || — || June 8, 2012 || Mount Lemmon || Mount Lemmon Survey || EUN || align=right | 1.1 km || 
|-id=953 bgcolor=#E9E9E9
| 534953 ||  || — || December 21, 2006 || Mount Lemmon || Mount Lemmon Survey ||  || align=right data-sort-value="0.76" | 760 m || 
|-id=954 bgcolor=#E9E9E9
| 534954 ||  || — || May 8, 2013 || Haleakala || Pan-STARRS ||  || align=right | 1.0 km || 
|-id=955 bgcolor=#E9E9E9
| 534955 ||  || — || April 15, 2012 || Haleakala || Pan-STARRS ||  || align=right data-sort-value="0.97" | 970 m || 
|-id=956 bgcolor=#E9E9E9
| 534956 ||  || — || October 31, 2005 || Catalina || CSS ||  || align=right | 1.5 km || 
|-id=957 bgcolor=#E9E9E9
| 534957 ||  || — || March 12, 2007 || Kitt Peak || Spacewatch ||  || align=right data-sort-value="0.88" | 880 m || 
|-id=958 bgcolor=#E9E9E9
| 534958 ||  || — || February 24, 2006 || Kitt Peak || Spacewatch ||  || align=right | 2.1 km || 
|-id=959 bgcolor=#E9E9E9
| 534959 ||  || — || November 26, 2014 || Haleakala || Pan-STARRS ||  || align=right | 1.1 km || 
|-id=960 bgcolor=#E9E9E9
| 534960 ||  || — || February 22, 2011 || Kitt Peak || Spacewatch ||  || align=right data-sort-value="0.80" | 800 m || 
|-id=961 bgcolor=#E9E9E9
| 534961 ||  || — || January 12, 2010 || WISE || WISE ||  || align=right data-sort-value="0.95" | 950 m || 
|-id=962 bgcolor=#E9E9E9
| 534962 ||  || — || January 9, 2006 || Kitt Peak || Spacewatch ||  || align=right | 2.0 km || 
|-id=963 bgcolor=#E9E9E9
| 534963 ||  || — || December 26, 2005 || Catalina || CSS ||  || align=right | 1.5 km || 
|-id=964 bgcolor=#E9E9E9
| 534964 ||  || — || April 24, 2011 || Kitt Peak || Spacewatch ||  || align=right | 2.6 km || 
|-id=965 bgcolor=#fefefe
| 534965 ||  || — || September 17, 2010 || Mount Lemmon || Mount Lemmon Survey || NYS || align=right data-sort-value="0.51" | 510 m || 
|-id=966 bgcolor=#fefefe
| 534966 ||  || — || October 11, 2010 || Mount Lemmon || Mount Lemmon Survey ||  || align=right data-sort-value="0.77" | 770 m || 
|-id=967 bgcolor=#fefefe
| 534967 ||  || — || September 28, 2003 || Anderson Mesa || LONEOS ||  || align=right data-sort-value="0.64" | 640 m || 
|-id=968 bgcolor=#E9E9E9
| 534968 ||  || — || November 30, 2010 || Mount Lemmon || Mount Lemmon Survey || (5) || align=right data-sort-value="0.66" | 660 m || 
|-id=969 bgcolor=#E9E9E9
| 534969 ||  || — || July 13, 2013 || Mount Lemmon || Mount Lemmon Survey ||  || align=right | 1.1 km || 
|-id=970 bgcolor=#E9E9E9
| 534970 ||  || — || November 20, 2014 || Mount Lemmon || Mount Lemmon Survey ||  || align=right | 1.7 km || 
|-id=971 bgcolor=#fefefe
| 534971 ||  || — || September 2, 2010 || Mount Lemmon || Mount Lemmon Survey ||  || align=right data-sort-value="0.77" | 770 m || 
|-id=972 bgcolor=#E9E9E9
| 534972 ||  || — || October 15, 2009 || Catalina || CSS ||  || align=right | 2.2 km || 
|-id=973 bgcolor=#E9E9E9
| 534973 ||  || — || September 19, 2009 || Mount Lemmon || Mount Lemmon Survey || WIT || align=right data-sort-value="0.82" | 820 m || 
|-id=974 bgcolor=#E9E9E9
| 534974 ||  || — || January 30, 2011 || Haleakala || Pan-STARRS ||  || align=right data-sort-value="0.75" | 750 m || 
|-id=975 bgcolor=#fefefe
| 534975 ||  || — || March 15, 2012 || Mount Lemmon || Mount Lemmon Survey ||  || align=right data-sort-value="0.61" | 610 m || 
|-id=976 bgcolor=#E9E9E9
| 534976 ||  || — || December 11, 2010 || Kitt Peak || Spacewatch ||  || align=right | 1.4 km || 
|-id=977 bgcolor=#C2FFFF
| 534977 ||  || — || November 4, 2014 || Mount Lemmon || Mount Lemmon Survey || L5 || align=right | 10 km || 
|-id=978 bgcolor=#fefefe
| 534978 ||  || — || March 10, 2008 || Mount Lemmon || Mount Lemmon Survey || NYS || align=right data-sort-value="0.47" | 470 m || 
|-id=979 bgcolor=#E9E9E9
| 534979 ||  || — || January 13, 2011 || Mount Lemmon || Mount Lemmon Survey ||  || align=right data-sort-value="0.92" | 920 m || 
|-id=980 bgcolor=#E9E9E9
| 534980 ||  || — || August 31, 2005 || Anderson Mesa || LONEOS ||  || align=right | 1.3 km || 
|-id=981 bgcolor=#d6d6d6
| 534981 ||  || — || November 21, 2008 || Kitt Peak || Spacewatch ||  || align=right | 3.1 km || 
|-id=982 bgcolor=#E9E9E9
| 534982 ||  || — || March 1, 2011 || La Sagra || OAM Obs. ||  || align=right | 1.1 km || 
|-id=983 bgcolor=#d6d6d6
| 534983 ||  || — || November 24, 2003 || Kitt Peak || Spacewatch ||  || align=right | 3.0 km || 
|-id=984 bgcolor=#fefefe
| 534984 ||  || — || December 20, 2004 || Mount Lemmon || Mount Lemmon Survey ||  || align=right data-sort-value="0.94" | 940 m || 
|-id=985 bgcolor=#E9E9E9
| 534985 ||  || — || October 23, 1995 || Kitt Peak || Spacewatch ||  || align=right | 1.9 km || 
|-id=986 bgcolor=#d6d6d6
| 534986 ||  || — || November 7, 2008 || Mount Lemmon || Mount Lemmon Survey ||  || align=right | 3.6 km || 
|-id=987 bgcolor=#E9E9E9
| 534987 ||  || — || September 29, 2009 || Mount Lemmon || Mount Lemmon Survey ||  || align=right | 1.5 km || 
|-id=988 bgcolor=#E9E9E9
| 534988 ||  || — || December 30, 2000 || Socorro || LINEAR ||  || align=right | 2.3 km || 
|-id=989 bgcolor=#E9E9E9
| 534989 ||  || — || November 27, 2014 || Mount Lemmon || Mount Lemmon Survey ||  || align=right data-sort-value="0.97" | 970 m || 
|-id=990 bgcolor=#E9E9E9
| 534990 ||  || — || October 25, 2005 || Kitt Peak || Spacewatch || (1547) || align=right | 1.5 km || 
|-id=991 bgcolor=#E9E9E9
| 534991 ||  || — || November 18, 2009 || Kitt Peak || Spacewatch || EUN || align=right | 1.4 km || 
|-id=992 bgcolor=#d6d6d6
| 534992 ||  || — || October 20, 2007 || Catalina || CSS || EOS || align=right | 2.3 km || 
|-id=993 bgcolor=#d6d6d6
| 534993 ||  || — || September 23, 2008 || Kitt Peak || Spacewatch ||  || align=right | 2.1 km || 
|-id=994 bgcolor=#d6d6d6
| 534994 ||  || — || January 21, 2009 || Mount Lemmon || Mount Lemmon Survey ||  || align=right | 3.6 km || 
|-id=995 bgcolor=#E9E9E9
| 534995 ||  || — || November 28, 2014 || Haleakala || Pan-STARRS ||  || align=right data-sort-value="0.90" | 900 m || 
|-id=996 bgcolor=#fefefe
| 534996 ||  || — || October 20, 2006 || Mount Lemmon || Mount Lemmon Survey || V || align=right data-sort-value="0.72" | 720 m || 
|-id=997 bgcolor=#d6d6d6
| 534997 ||  || — || February 17, 2010 || Kitt Peak || Spacewatch || EOS || align=right | 2.0 km || 
|-id=998 bgcolor=#E9E9E9
| 534998 ||  || — || October 10, 2005 || Siding Spring || SSS ||  || align=right | 1.8 km || 
|-id=999 bgcolor=#E9E9E9
| 534999 ||  || — || November 28, 2014 || Haleakala || Pan-STARRS ||  || align=right | 2.1 km || 
|-id=000 bgcolor=#E9E9E9
| 535000 ||  || — || August 15, 2013 || Haleakala || Pan-STARRS ||  || align=right | 1.4 km || 
|}

References

External links 
 Discovery Circumstances: Numbered Minor Planets (530001)–(535000) (IAU Minor Planet Center)

0534